= Maung O =

Burmese prince (d. 1840)

Prince of Salin
- Reign: 1823 – 15 April 1837
- Born: unknown Phalangon
- Died: 12 May 1840; Tuesday, 12th waxing of Kason 1202 ME; Amarapura
- Spouse: Min Tha
- Issue: Thiri Thukalaya of Amyint; Thiri Thuta Yadana of Saku
Names
- Thado Maha Thudhamma Yaza (သတိုး မဟာ သုဓမ္မ ရာဇာ)
- House: Konbaung
- Father: Thiha Kyawswa of Shwedaung
- Mother: Daw Nge
- Religion: Theravada Buddhism

Maung O, Prince of Salin (also spelt Maung Oh, Burmese: စလင်းမင်းသားကြီး မောင်အို; ? – 12 May 1840), was a prince of the first rank of the Konbaung dynasty of Burma. He was the brother of Nanmadaw Me Nu, the chief queen of King Bagyidaw. Favored by the king and queen, he was granted the appanage of Salin, Saku and Thamyintone with the title of Thado Maha Thudhamma Yaza. He and Me Nu became the de facto rulers and are some examples of powerful figures who were the most powerful officials of their time.

== Life ==
=== Early life ===
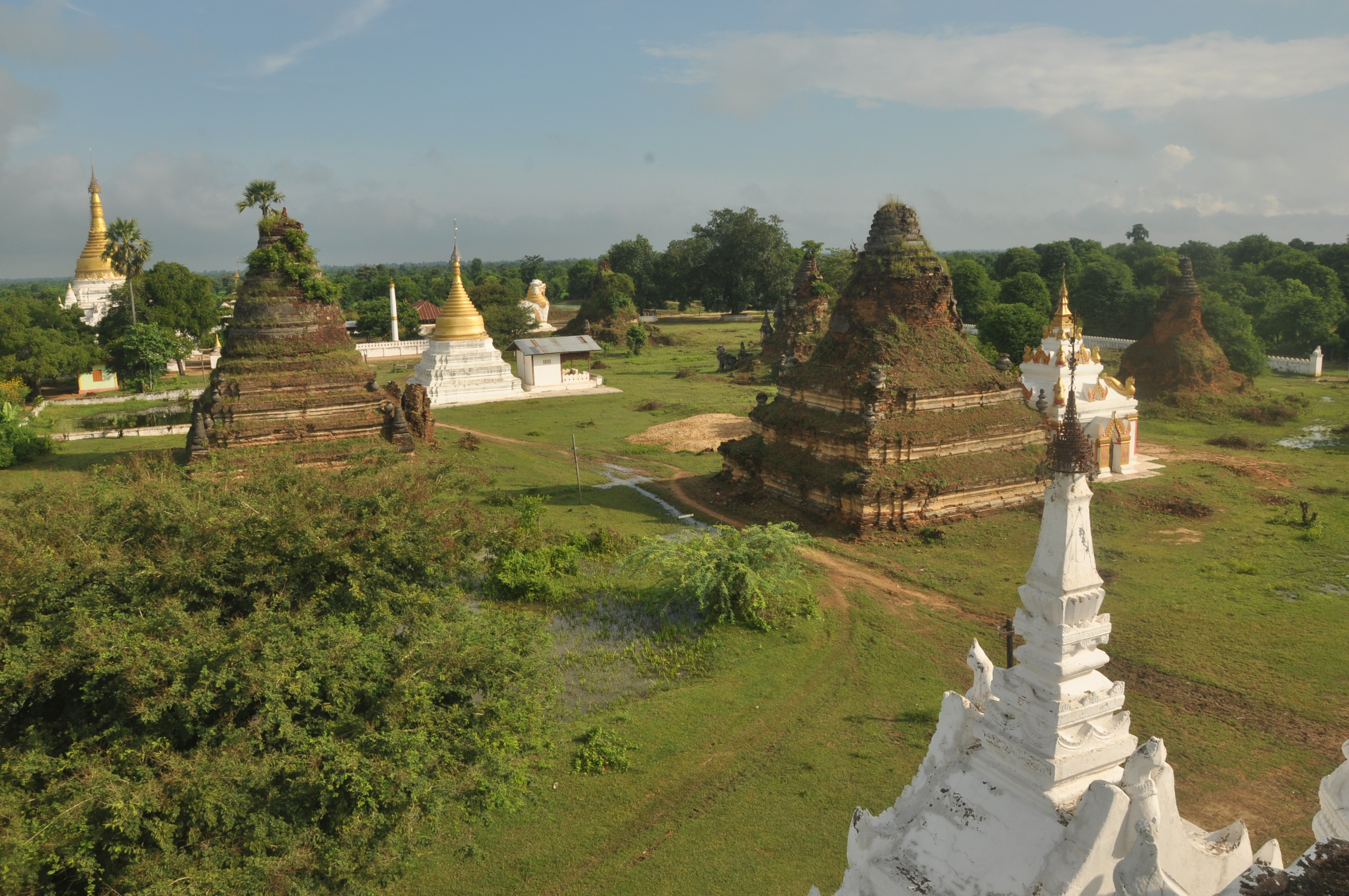
Phalangon Pagoda donated by Maung O and Me Nu

Maung O was born to U Hlote, commander of a thousand-man cavalry regiment (later Thiha Kyawswa of Shwedaung) and Daw Nge in Phalangon. He had a younger sister, Me Nu, who later became the chief queen. According to historian Hmawbi Saya Thein, it is believed that U Hlote had three children: Me Pu, Maung O, and Me Nu. However, the royal chronicle only mentions Me Nu and Maung O. There is a dispute between Me Nu and Maung O regarding their birth order, with conflicting accounts. According to bell and stone inscriptions of Konbaung, it is suggested that Me Nu was the eldest, and Maung O was the youngest.

He was married to Ma Min Tha, from a nearby village Myinpauk. His wife was also granted the title of Princess of Salin with the regnal name Thiri Yadana Matha Waddi. The couple had two daughters: Thiri Thukalaya, Duchess of Amyint, and Thiri Thuta Yadana, Duchess of Saku. He authored the Yazawunthadipaka, a chronicle of the Konbaung dynasty.

=== Rise and fall ===
Maung O's rise to power was due to his sister Nanmadaw Me Nu becoming King Bagyidaw's favorite queen. The king gave his brother-in-law Salin, Saku and Thamyintone in fief and granted him the title of great prince in 1823. He was the only non-royal to hold the title of great prince. In the monarchic era, successive Burmese kings did not appoint ordinary individuals to the position of the Duke of Salin. It is believed that only trusted individuals who held significance in the eyes of the king were granted appointments to govern the Salin province. As a prince regent, he wielded significant power and had the authority to pass judgments within the royal parliament (Hluttaw). At the time, as the prophecy foretold 'ရွှေဘိုချဉ်ပေါင်၊ ခုနစ်တောင်၊ ဖူးခေါင်ဝေ၍ဖြိုး' was widely spread among the public. This prophecy meant "the Konbaung dynasty would come to an end during the reign of the seventh ruler".

Maung O along with his sister and Gen. Maha Bandula became the leaders of the faction that advocated for war with the British. In the First Anglo-Burmese War, Maung O served on the front line, and in recognition of his bravery and service, court poet U Bhone honored him by composing a four-part poem in honor of the Prince of Salin. After the disastrous First Anglo-Burmese War (1824–1826) left the country crippled, Bagyidaw became increasingly reclusive, afflicted by bouts of depression, and could not handle the administration of the state. The court power devolved to his chief queen Me Nu and her brother. Me Nu and Maung O became the de facto rulers of the country. They were much feared due to their tyrannical policies.

Maung O came into conflict with the Crown Prince Tharrawaddy. When Tharrawaddy wanted to renew the war with the British by going to Rangoon himself, Maung O suggested to the king that it was a ploy by Tharrawaddy to revolt. The conflict between O and the crown prince led to Tharrawaddy's eventual revolt. On 21 February 1837, troops on the order of Maung O raided the residence of Princess Pagan (Bagan), sister of Tharawaddy. As the raid continued at the mansion of Prince Tharawaddy, fire was exchanged between the troops of the prince's mansion and the raiding troops. On 24 February 1837, Maung O set fire to the mansion of the crown prince, forcing the crown prince to leave for Shwebo, the ancestral place of the Konbaung kings, with 500 troops. Then Prince Tharrawaddy raised a rebellion.

By April, Tharrawaddy had forced Bagyidaw to abdicate. The new king put his brother under house arrest and sentenced Me Nu and Maung O to death on 12 May 1840.

The trader Edge Gorger, who visited the Inwa palace during the reign of King Bagyidaw described Maung O as

"Prince Maung O, the brother of Queen Me Nu is horrific and a philanderer. He is arrogant, fierce, and cruel. He also tends to be revengeful, and one can get promoted easily just by bribing him. This seems to be his way of doing business. Citizens both hate and fear him. Everyone except the thick and unintelligent King knows that Maung O is secretly aiming for the throne."

— Edge Gorger

== Donations ==
As a religious deed, he established several significant contributions, including Phalangon Pagoda, U O Pagoda, U O Monastery, Maha Zeya Pahta Brick Bridge, and Khayetan Bridge.

== Bibliography ==
- Maung Maung Tin, U (1905). Konbaung Set Yazawin (in Burmese). Vol. 1–3 (2004 ed.). Yangon: Department of Universities History Research, University of Yangon.
- Myint-U, Thant (2006). The River of Lost Footsteps—Histories of Burma. Farrar, Straus and Giroux. ISBN 978-0-374-16342-6.
