= Inwa =

14th–19th-century Burmese imperial capital

Inwa အင်းဝ Ava
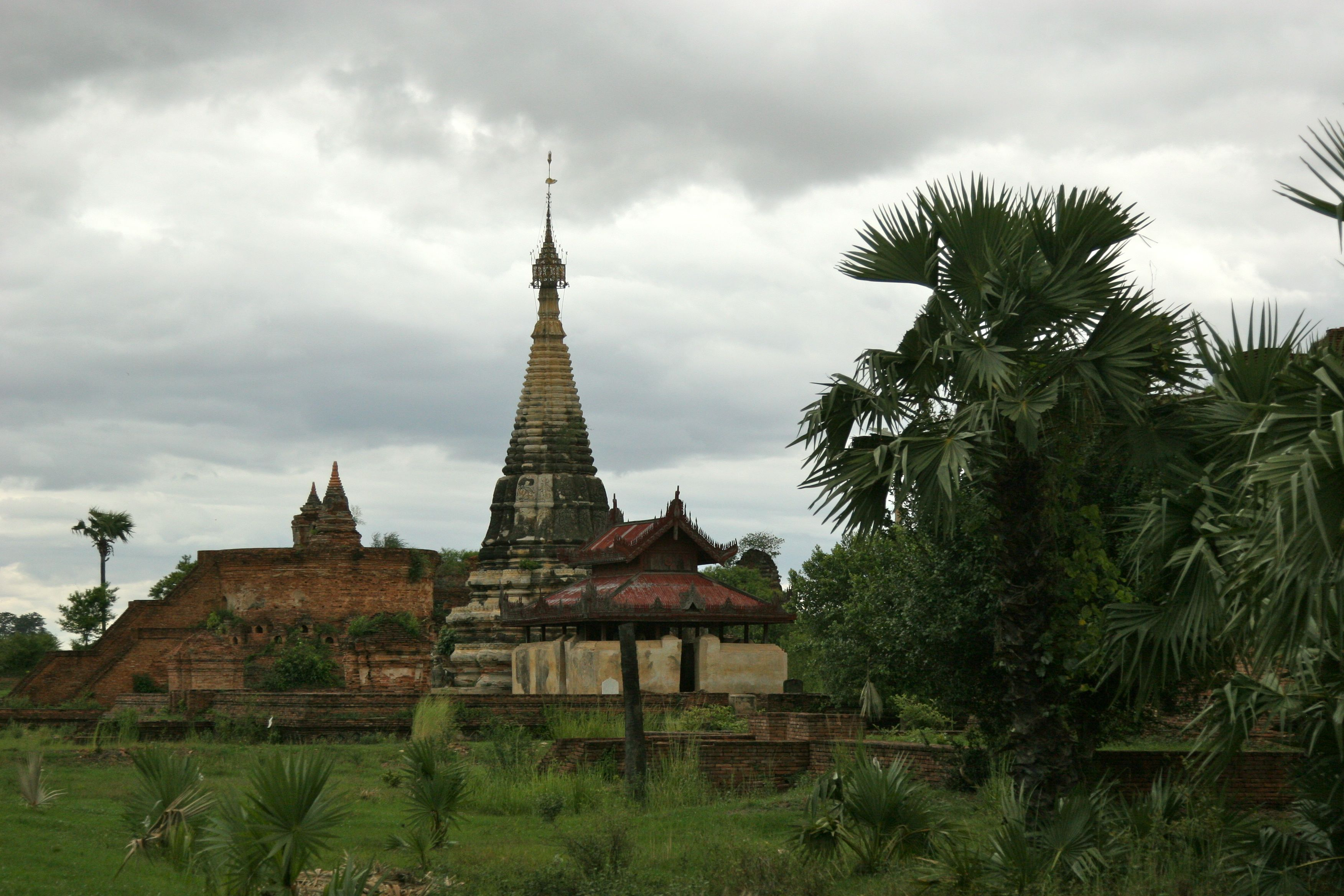

- Location of Ava
- Coordinates: 21°51′28″N 95°59′06″E
- Country: Myanmar
- Region: Mandalay Region
- District: Tada-U District
- Township: Tada-U Township
- Founded: 26 February 1365

Population
  - Ethnicities: Bamar
  - Religions: Theravada Buddhism
- Time zone: UTC+6.30 (MMT)

Inwa (Burmese: အင်းဝမြို့, MLCTS: ang:wa.mrui., IPA: [ʔɪ́ɰ̃wa̰ mjo̰] or [ʔəwa̰ mjo̰]; also spelled Innwa; formerly known as အဝ Ava), located in Mandalay Region, Myanmar, is an ancient imperial capital of successive Burmese kingdoms from the 14th to 19th centuries. Throughout history, it was sacked and rebuilt numerous times. The capital city was finally abandoned after it was destroyed by a series of major earthquakes in March 1839. Though only a few traces of its former grandeur remain today, the former capital is a popular day-trip tourist destination from Mandalay.

== Etymology ==
The name Inwa (အင်းဝ) literally means "mouth of the Lake", reflecting its geographical location at the mouth of lakes in the Kyaukse District. Another theory states that it is derived from Innawa (အင်းနဝ), meaning "nine lakes" in the area. The city's classical name in Pali is Ratanapura (ရတနပုရ; "City of Gems").

The modern standard Burmese pronunciation is Inwa (IPA: [ʔɪ́ɰ̃wa̰]), following the modern orthography. But the local Upper Burmese pronunciation is Awa ([ʔəwa̰]). Indeed, the spelling of the city in the royal records, all written prior to the modern Burmese spelling standardization drives, is အဝ (Awa), the phonetic spelling of the Upper Burmese usage. The most common Western transcription Ava comes from Awa via Portuguese.

== History ==
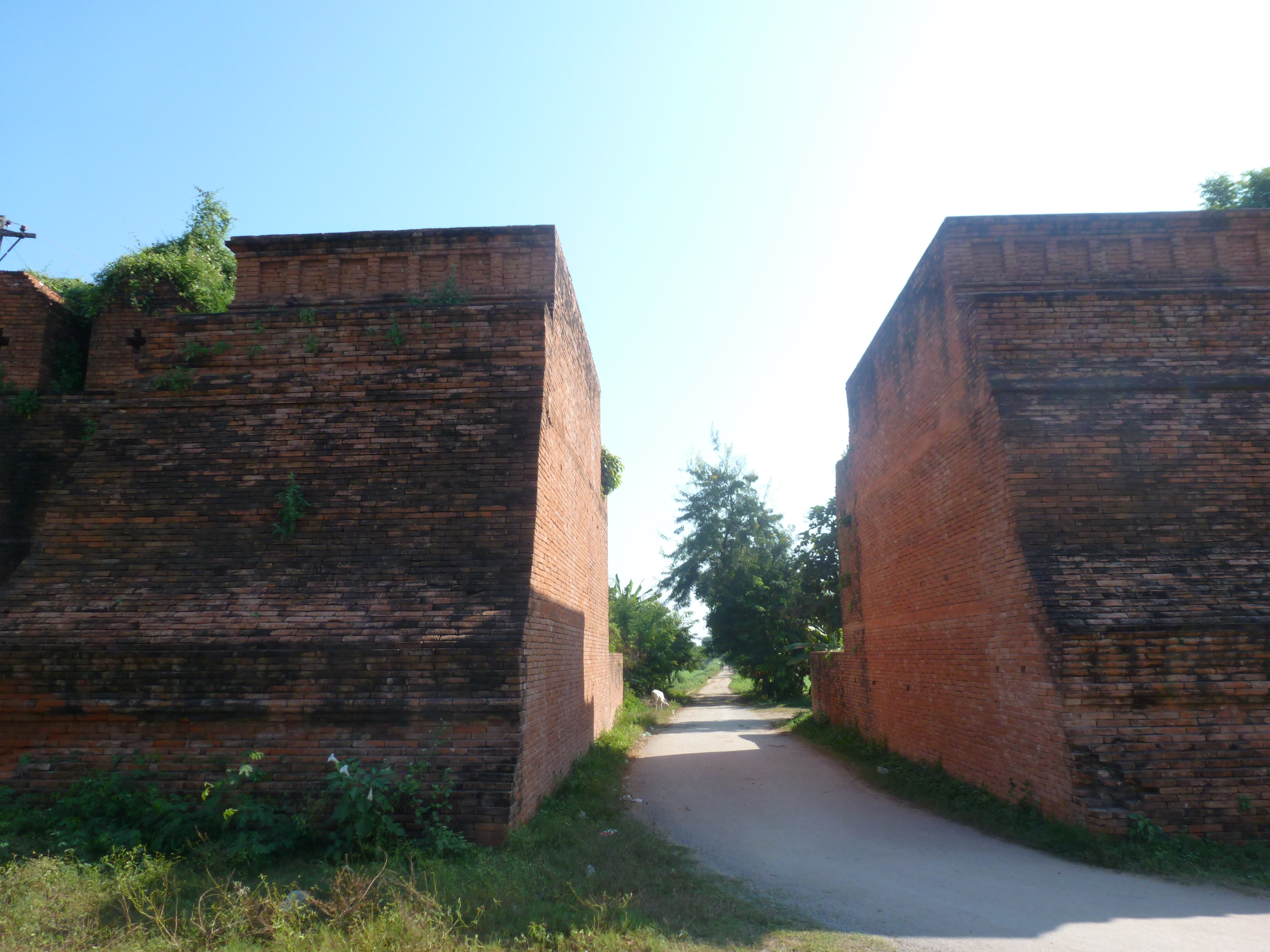
Remains of the outer walls

Inwa was the capital of Myanmar (Burma) for nearly 360 years, on five occasions, from 1365 to 1842. So identified as the seat of power in Burma that Inwa (as the Kingdom of Ava, or the Court of Ava) was the name by which Burma was known to Europeans down to the 19th century.

=== Foundation ===
Strategically located on the confluence of the Irrawaddy, and Myitnge rivers, and in the main rice-growing Kyaukse District of Upper Burma, the location of Ava had been scouted as a possible capital site as early as 1310 by King Thihathu. Though Thihathu eventually built his new capital at Pinya a few miles east inland in 1313, Thihathu's great-grandson Thado Minbya, who unified the Sagaing and Pinya kingdoms in September 1364, chose the site of Inwa as his new capital.

Inwa was officially founded on 26 February 1365 (6th waxing of Tabaung 726 ME) on a man-made island created by connecting the Irrawaddy on the north and the Myitnge on the east with a canal on the south and the west. The construction of the artificial island also involved filling in the swamplands and lakes (or Ins):†

1. Shwekyabin In (ရွှေကြာပင် အင်း)
2. Zani In (ဇနီ အင်း)
3. Nyaungzauk In (ညောင်စောက် အင်း)
4. Wetchi In (ဝက်ချေး အင်း)
5. Ohnne In (အုန္နဲ အင်း)
6. Inma In (အင်းမ အင်း)
7. Linsan In (လင်းစံ အင်း)
8. Bayme In (ဘေးမဲ့ အင်း)
9. Wunbe In (ဝမ်းဘဲ အင်း)

† Other records also include Kyaukmaw In (ကျောက်မော် အင်း), Ngagyi In (ငကျည်း အင်း) and Inbu In (အင်းဘူး အင်း).

The brick fortifications of Inwa do not follow the conventions of the earlier rectilinear city plans; Inwa's citadel is probably the only barrel shaped city in the world. Instead, the zigzagged outer walls are popularly thought to outline the figure of a seated lion – the Burmese Chinthe. The inner enclosure or citadel was laid out according to traditional cosmological principles and provided the requisite twelve gates. (The inner city was reconstructed on at least three occasions in 1597, 1763, and 1832.) The design of Inwa, or at least the inner citadel, is designed to replicate the Buddhist universe in miniature. The palace was constructed in the very centre of the citadel, which according to traditional principles of Burmese city design, corresponds to the location of the Buddha, therefore directly associating the King with the Buddha himself. This conferred upon the King a divine status and the palace as a religious centrepiece. The kingdom and its power emanated directly from the city as a mandala, encircling the entirety of the world (in theory) and therefore the city was a cosmological centre of a divinely ordained kingdom.

=== Ava period (14th to 16th centuries) ===
The kingdom Thado Minbya founded with the capital at Inwa became known as the Ava Kingdom, the main polity of Upper Burma until 1555. During this period, the city was the center of a flourishing literary scene in which Burmese literature "grew more confident, popular, and stylistically diverse, chiefly through the efforts of monks who chose to write in the vernacular rather than, or in addition to, in Pali." The period also saw the second generation of Burmese law codes (dhammathats), which critiqued earlier compilations, new poetic genres, and the perfection of older verse forms as well as the earliest pan-Burma Burmese language chronicles. The city got a new "exquisite golden palace" in February 1511 by which King Shwenankyawshin is posthumously remembered.

During the reign of Swa Saw Ke, a council was convened at Ava which was attended by the King, members of the Sangha, Sinhalese monks, and Brahmins. In one inscription the city was said to be as pleasant as Tavatimsa, the most important of the Buddhist heavens which also served as the model for the earthly realm of Burmese kingdoms. Swa Saw Ke was known as an intellectual king who encouraged scholarly endeavours and the city was said to be full of intelligent conversation.

During this period, the capital city was the target of the kingdom's rivals. It came under siege in 1401–1402 during the Forty Years' War. Over a century later, on 25 March 1527, the city finally fell to the repeated attacks by the Confederation of Shan States and the Prome Kingdom. It then became the capital of the unruly and often disunited coalition until 22 January 1555 when it was captured by King Bayinnaung. The city's 190-year run as the capital of Upper Burma came to an end.

=== Toungoo and Konbaung periods (16th to 19th centuries) ===
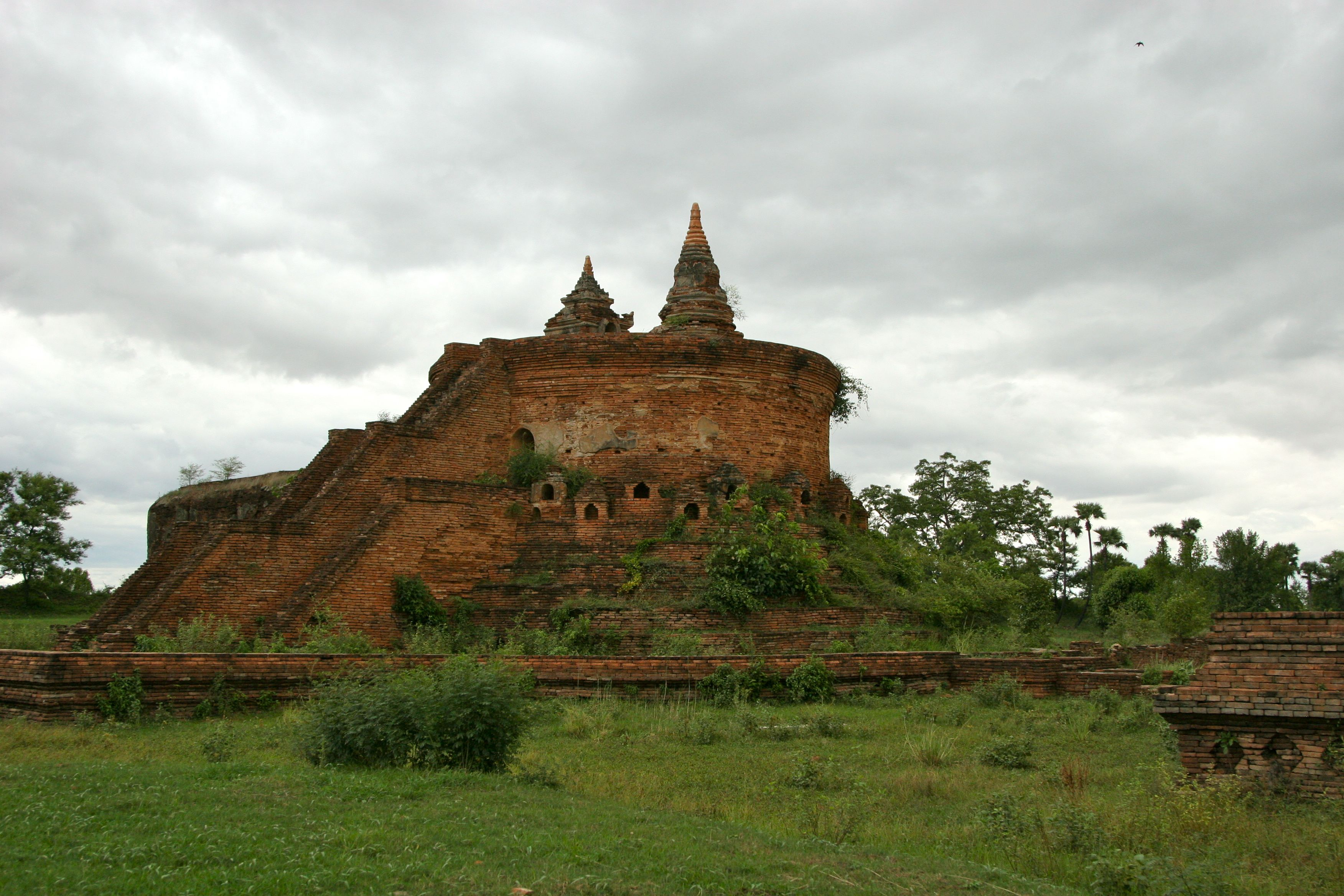
Stupa ruins

The city became the capital of all Burma during Toungoo and Konbaung periods (1599–1613, 1635–1752, 1765–1783, 1821–1842). The city was the base from which kings Nyaungyan and Anaukpetlun restored the kingdom which had temporarily disintegrated in December 1599. In January 1635, King Thalun moved the capital back to Ava from Pegu (Bago). The city was sacked on 21–23 March 1752, and subsequently burned down on 3 January 1753 by the forces of Restored Hanthawaddy Kingdom. King Hsinbyushin began the reconstruction of the city in March 1764, and moved the capital back to a newly rebuilt Ava on 23 July 1765. King Bodawpaya moved the capital to Amarapura in May 1783 but his grandson King Bagyidaw moved it back to Ava in November 1821.

=== Destruction ===
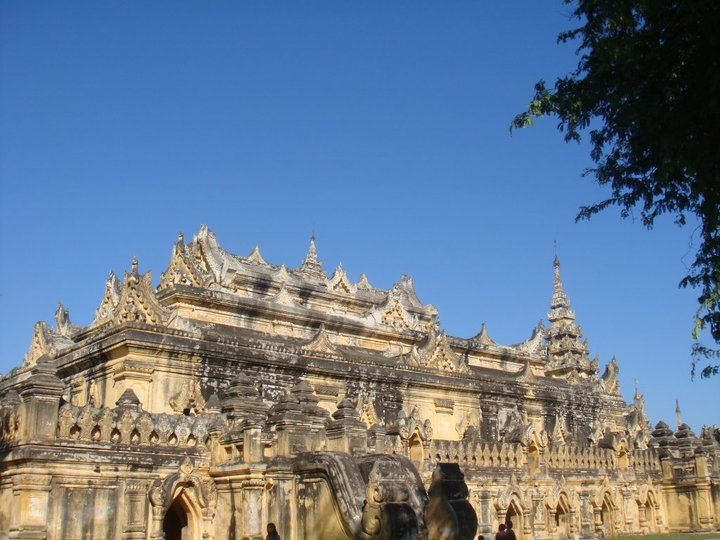
Me Nu Monastery

Beginning on 22 March 1839 (7th waxing of Tagu 1201 ME), earthquakes began affecting the Inwa–Amapura region. The largest earthquake struck at 05:00 on 23 March, being felt over a wide area, and many aftershocks followed for days. The entire region was left in shambles in their wake. The city was destroyed while many people and livestock perished. The city was not rebuilt. King Tharrawaddy chose instead to rebuild a new palace in Amarapura, and moved the seat of his government there in February 1842.

=== Contemporary Inwa ===
The former capital city site is a popular tourist day-trip destination from Mandalay. Tourists can still observe a few remnants of the capital, including Nanmadaw Me Nu Ok Kyaung, the Nanmyin Tower, the inner and outer brick city walls, and other sites.

=== 2025 Myanmar earthquake ===
Inwa was largely destroyed in the 2025 Myanmar earthquake. Within the city, 75% of the historical structures were damaged, including pagodas and temples. The earthquake also unearthed a water palace used for royal ceremonies. The Ministry of Religious Affairs and Culture plans to excavate and preserve the structure.

== Sights of interest ==
Name	Picture	Built	Sponsor(s)	Notes
Ava Bridge		1934	The British	This 16 span cantilever bridge was the only structure to span the Irrawaddy until recently. Although now superseded by a parallel 2005 road bridge, it is still in use for railway and local road traffic.
Ava Palace site		1821	King Bagyidaw	The site of the deserted Palace of Ava is now marked by a solitary masonry 27 m (89 ft) high watchtower, an example of early 19th century Burmese architecture. It is all that remains of the stately Palace reared by King Bagyidaw.
Bagaya Monastery		1770s	Maha Thiri Zeya Thinkhaya	"Monastic college" where the royals were educated
Four-Storied Monastery				
Htihlaing Shin Pagoda				A stupa built by King Kyansittha of Pagan Dynasty (late 11th century)
Judson Memorial				A stone that marks the site of Let Ma Yun (lit. "no pulling punches") prison where the American missionary Adoniram Judson was incarcerated during the First Anglo-Burmese War (1824–26)
Lawka Tharahpu Pagoda				
Maha Aungmye Bonzan Monastery		1822	Queen Me Nu	Popularly known as Me Nu Ok Kyaung (lit. "Me Nu's Brick Monastery"), it was built in 1818 by Nanmadaw Me Nu, the famous Chief Queen of Bagyidaw, for the residence of her religious Preceptor, the Nyaunggan Sayadaw. The earthquake of 1838, damaged it, and in 1873, it was restored by Sinbyumashin, Queen of Mindon, and a daughter of Nanmadaw Me Nu. The building is markedly different from traditional Burmese monasteries, which are constructed with wood, not masonry.
Yadana Hsimi Pagodas				A group of small stupas in ruins (from the 1839 earthquakes)

== Transport ==
Inwa is located 21 km (13 mi) south of Mandalay. It is on the way from the Mandalay International Airport to Mandalay. Cars can go up to the Myitnge river. It takes a 3-minute boat ride to cross over to the former capital site. On the Inwa side, a number of horse-drawn carts await the tourist business.

== Gallery ==
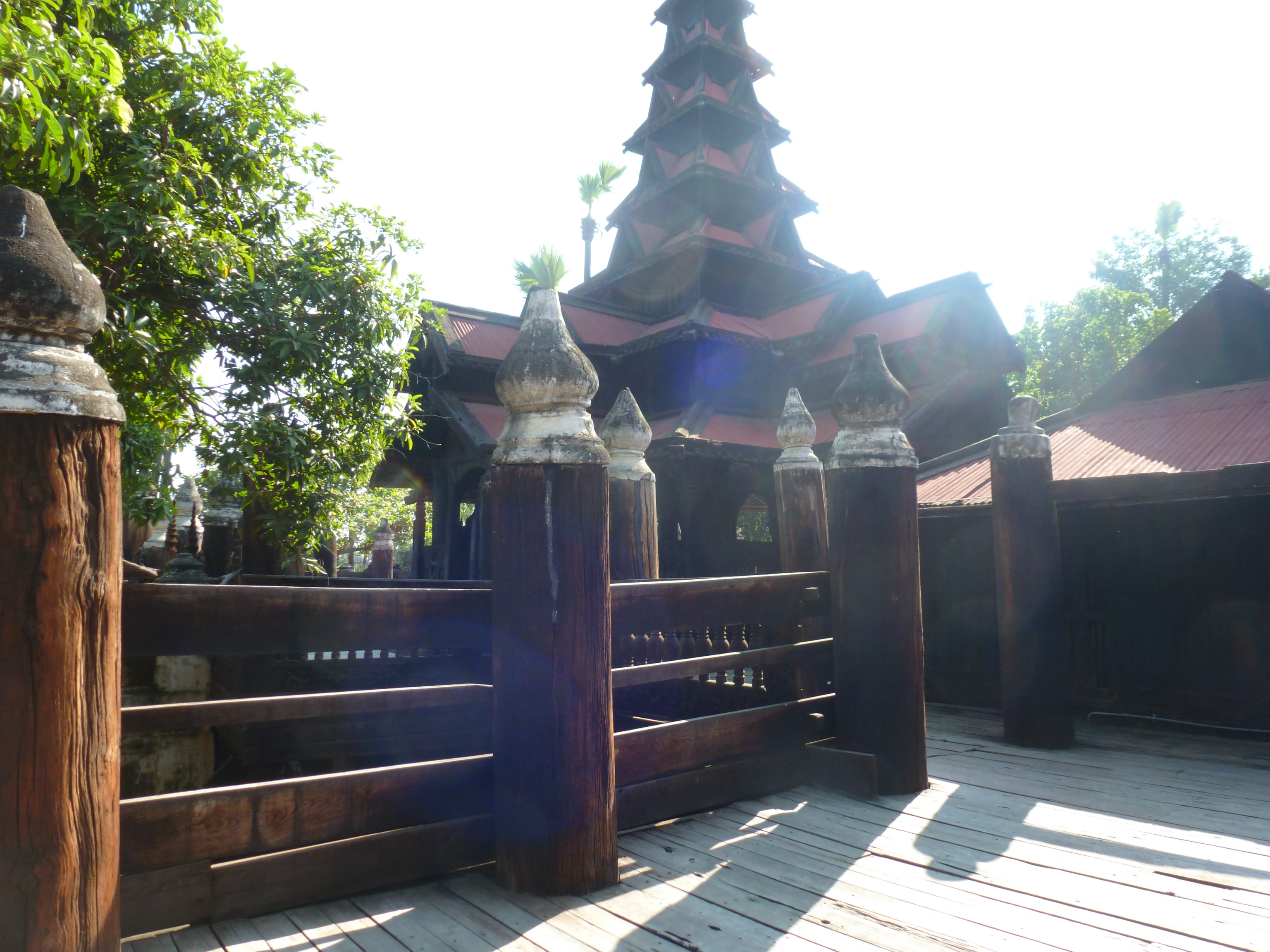
Bagaya Monastery, the "monastic college" for the royals during the Konbaung period

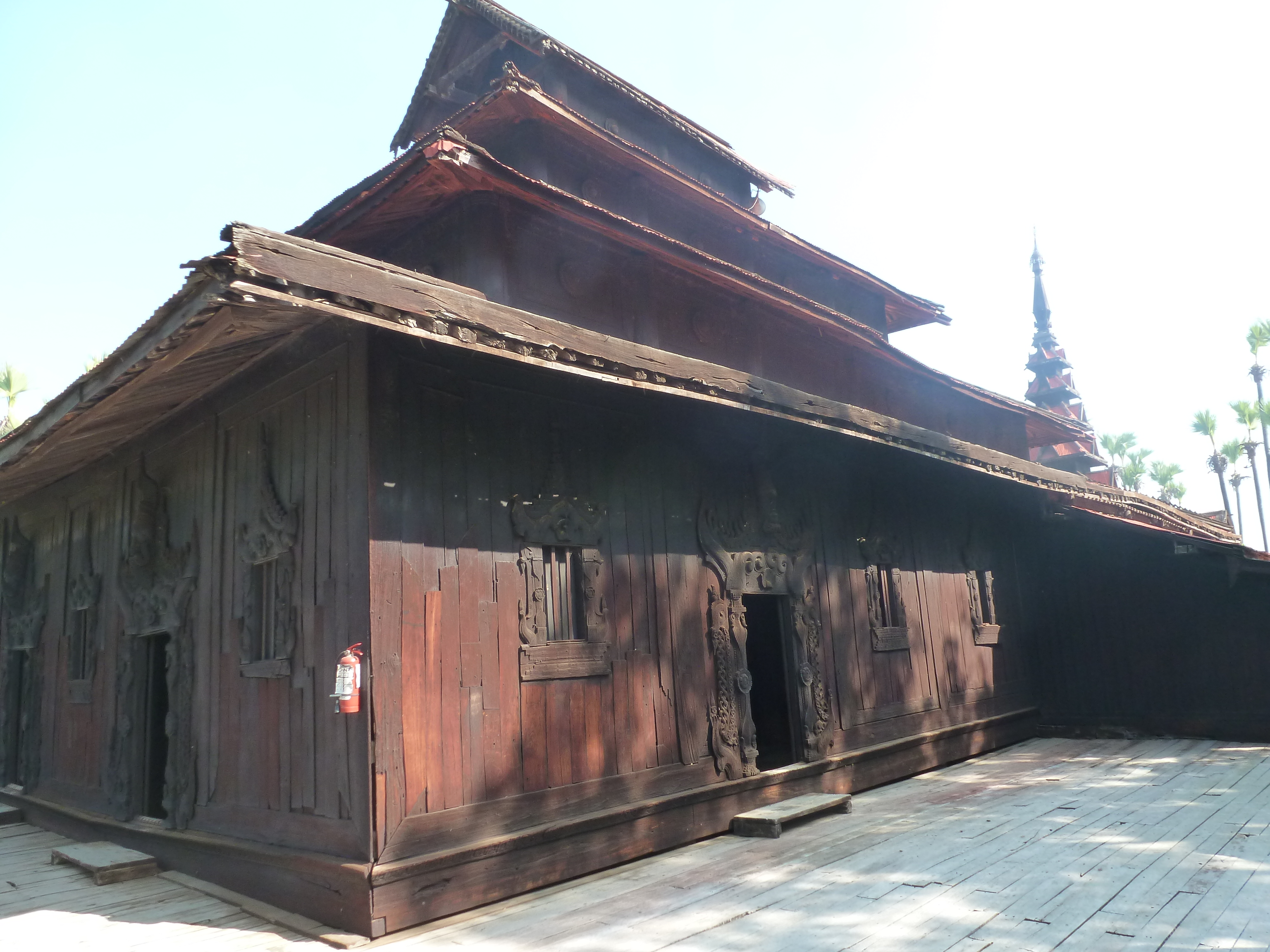
Bagaya Monastery, back

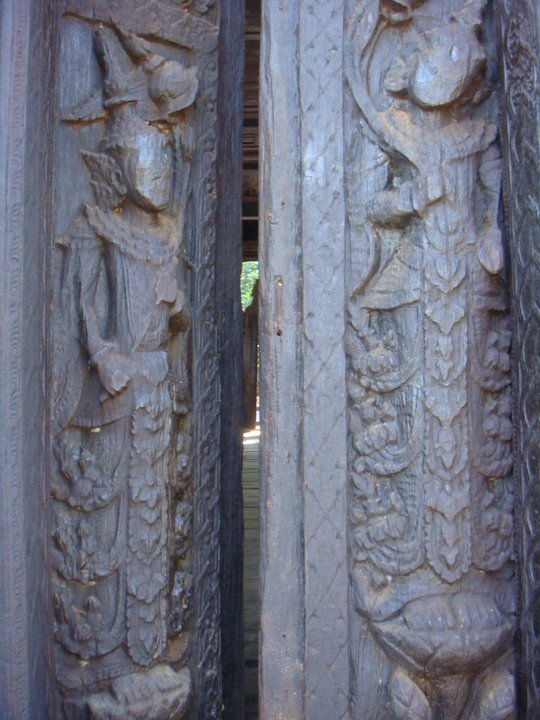
Wooden doors at the Bagaya

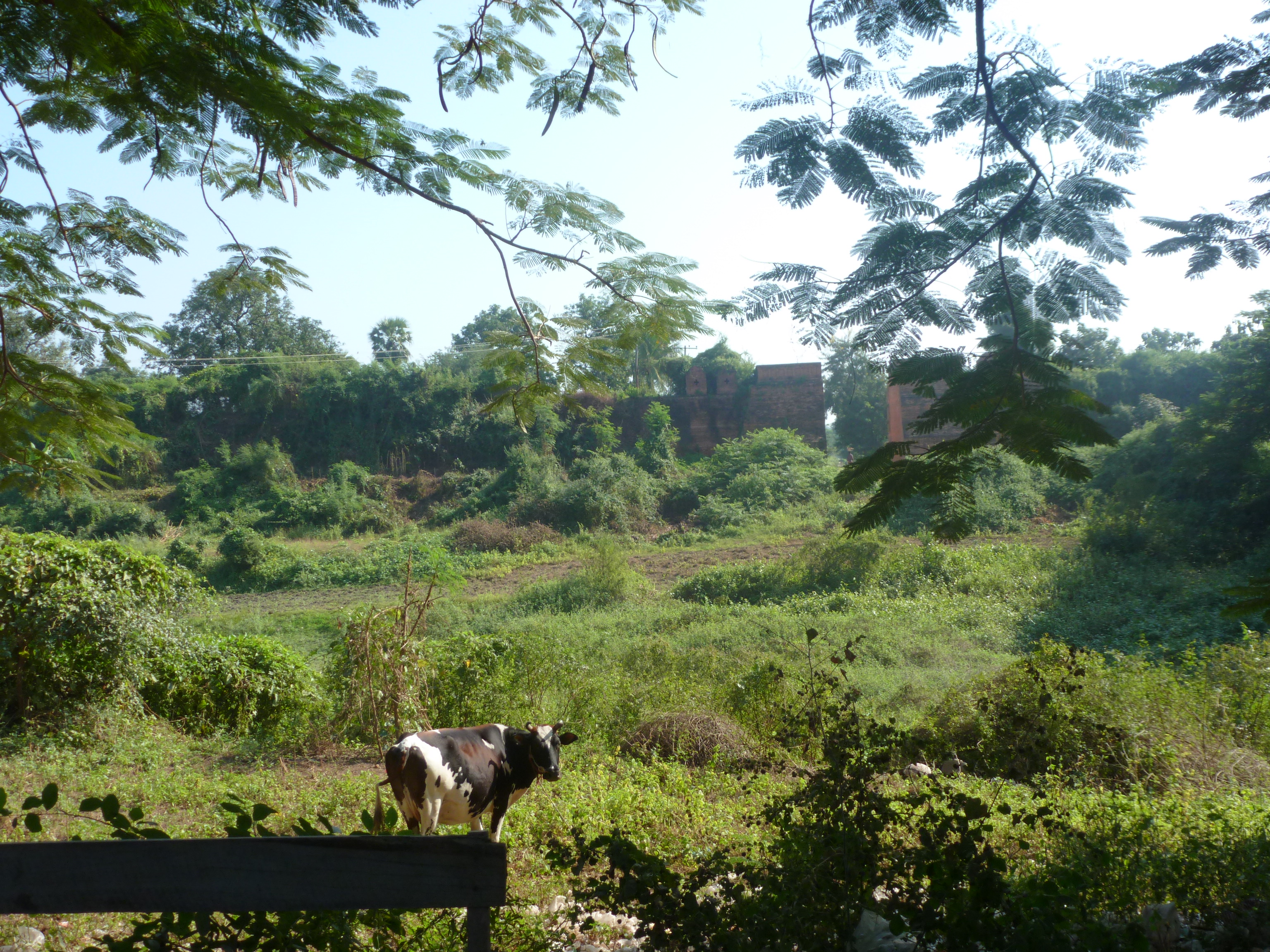
Second-level outer walls as seen across the former moat

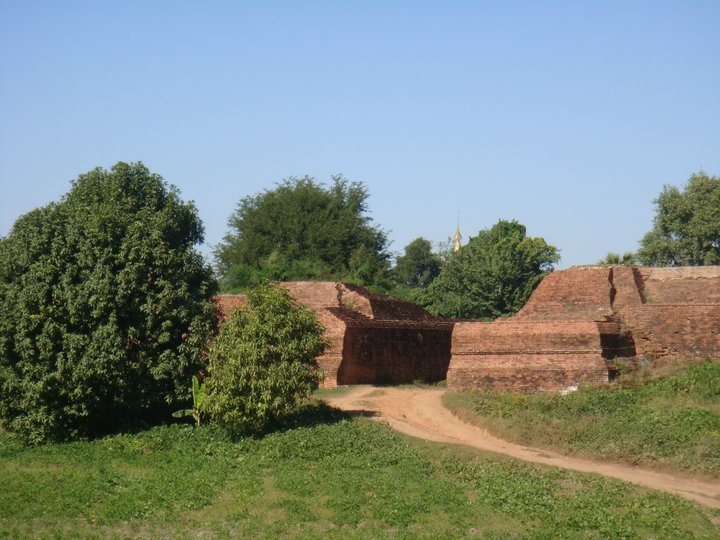
Outer walls

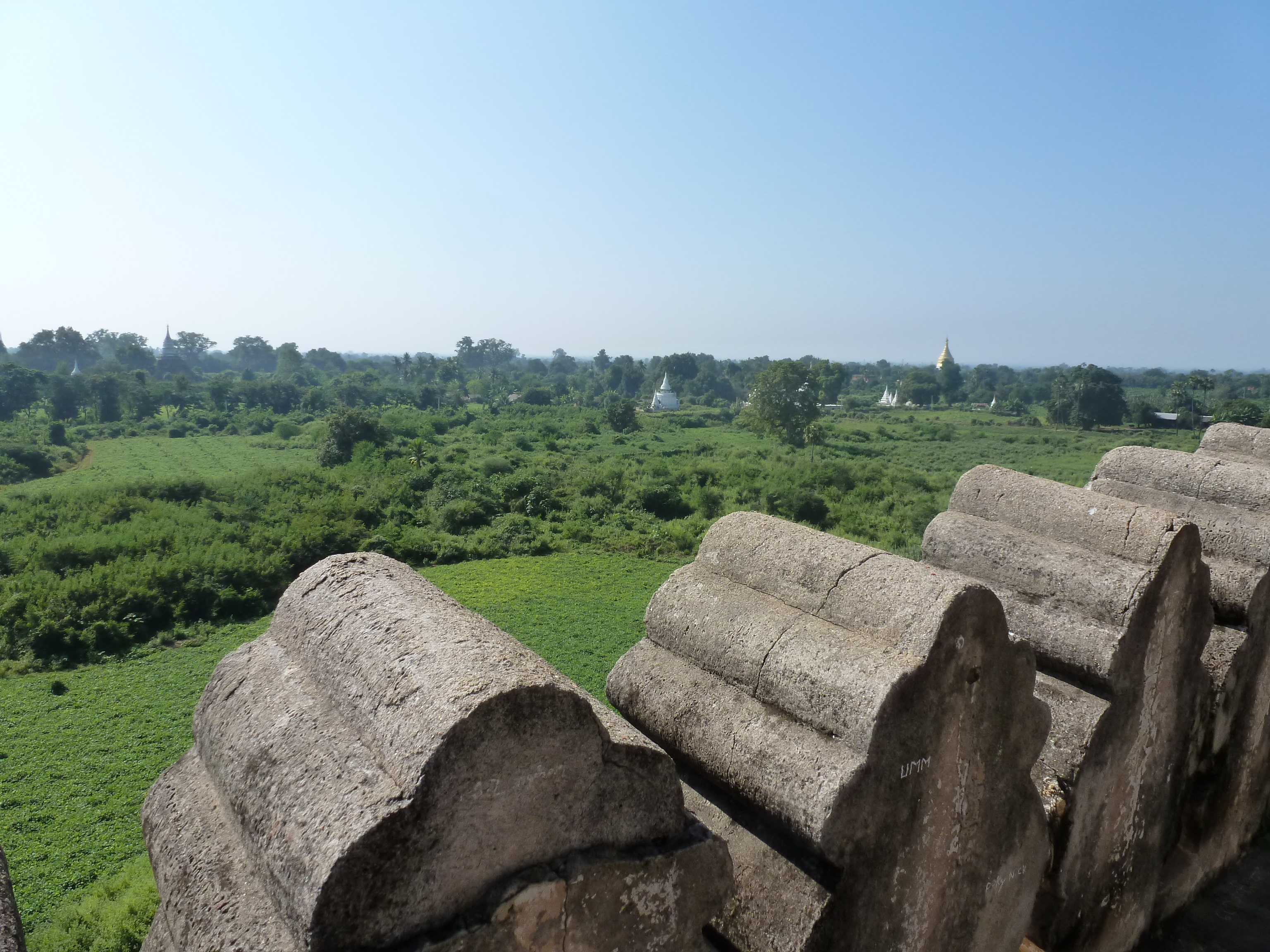
The Ava Palace site as seen from the Nanmyin Watchtower

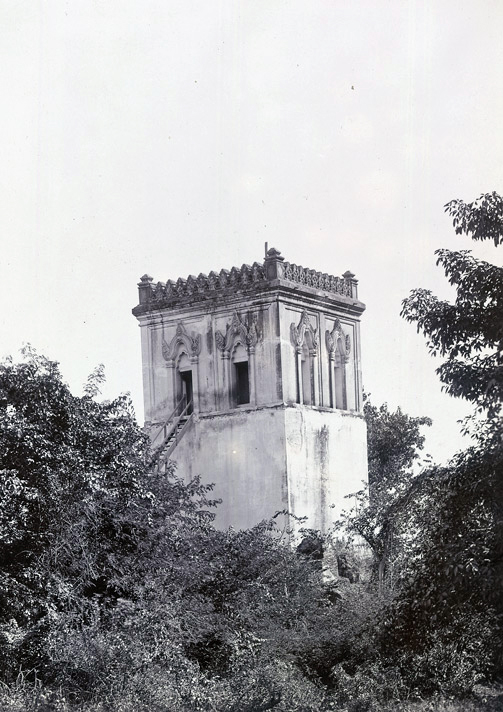
Palace watchtower in 1907

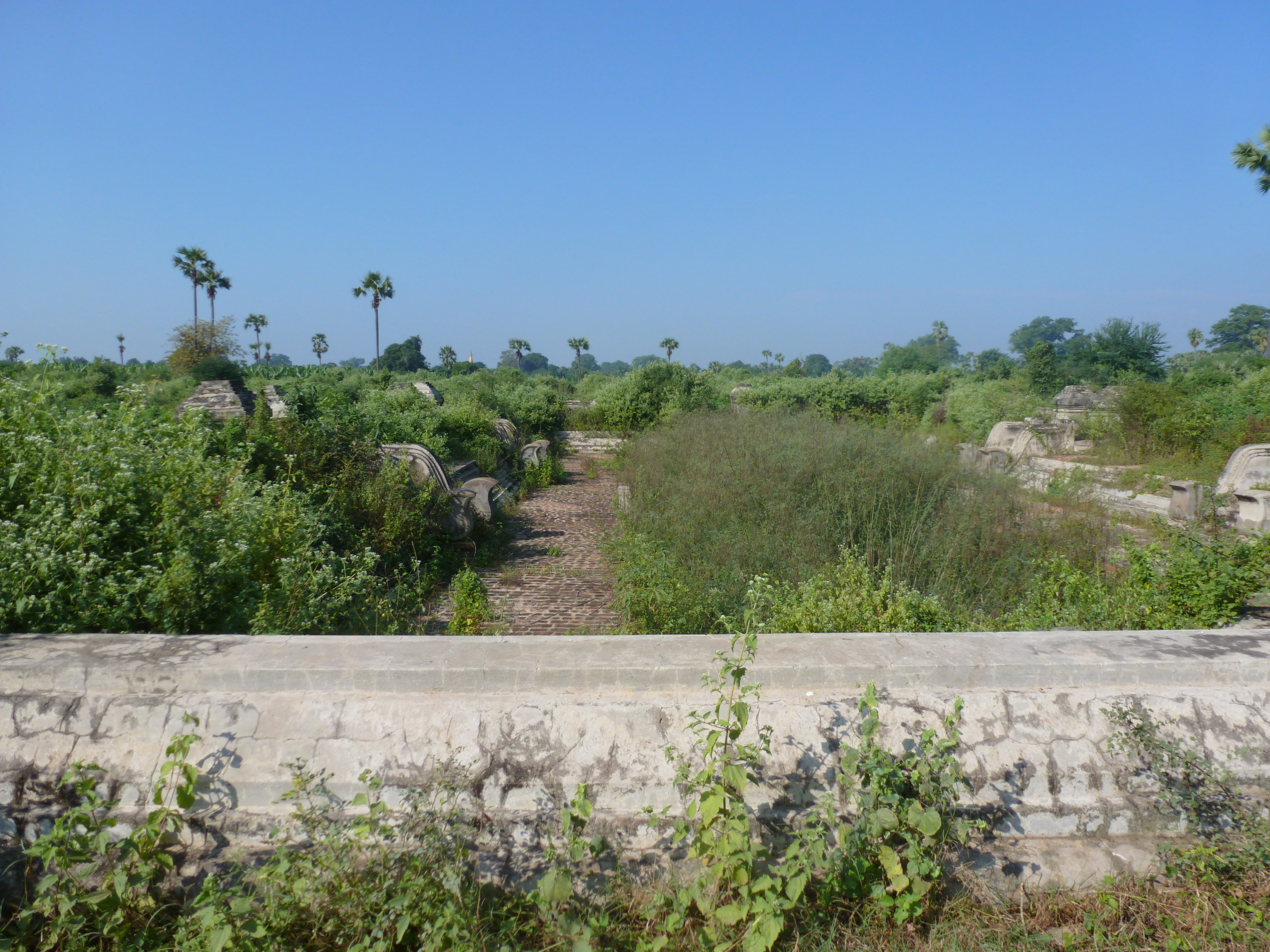
Royal Pool for Princesses, also at the Ava Palace site

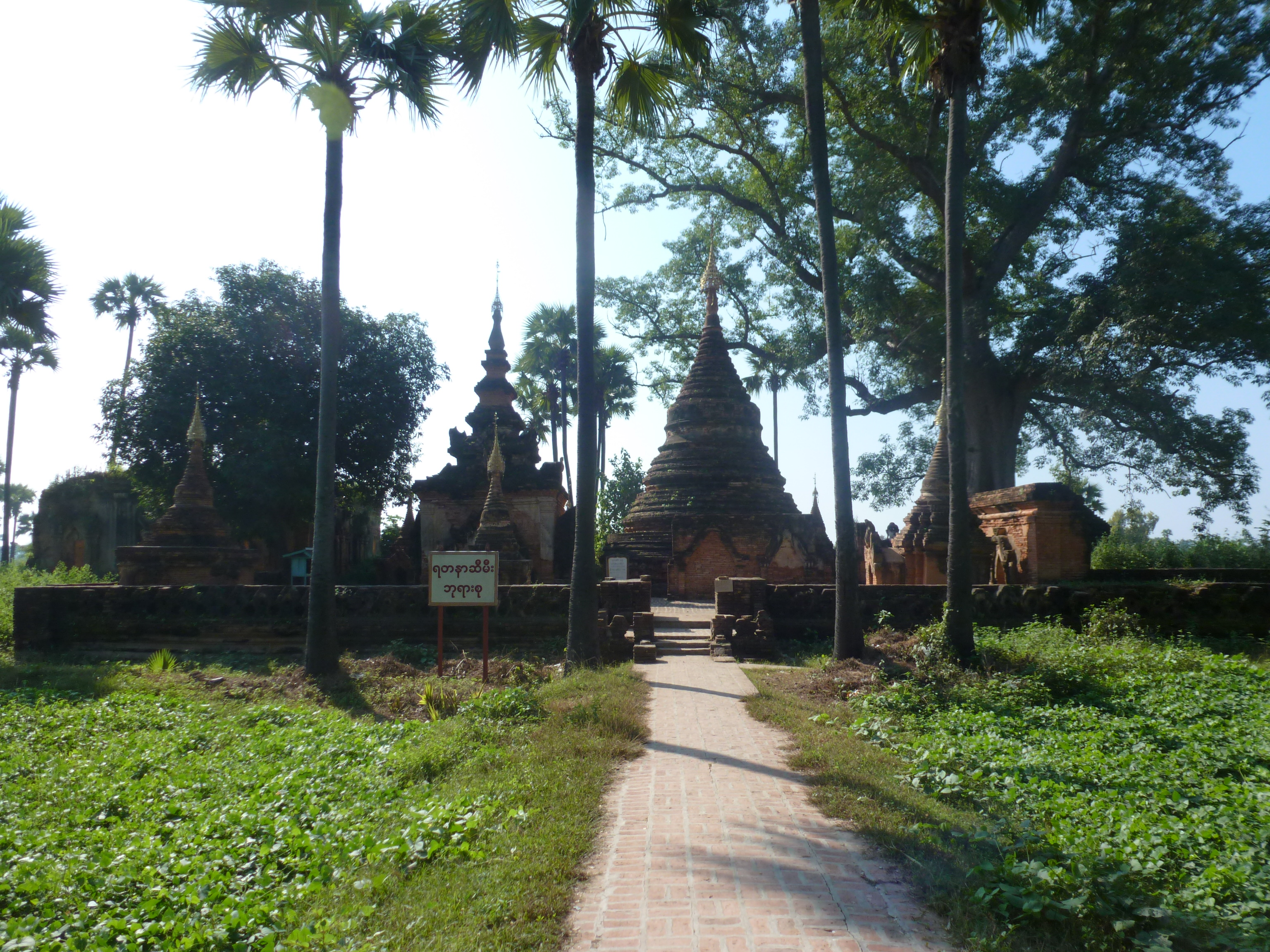
Yadana Hsimi Pagodas

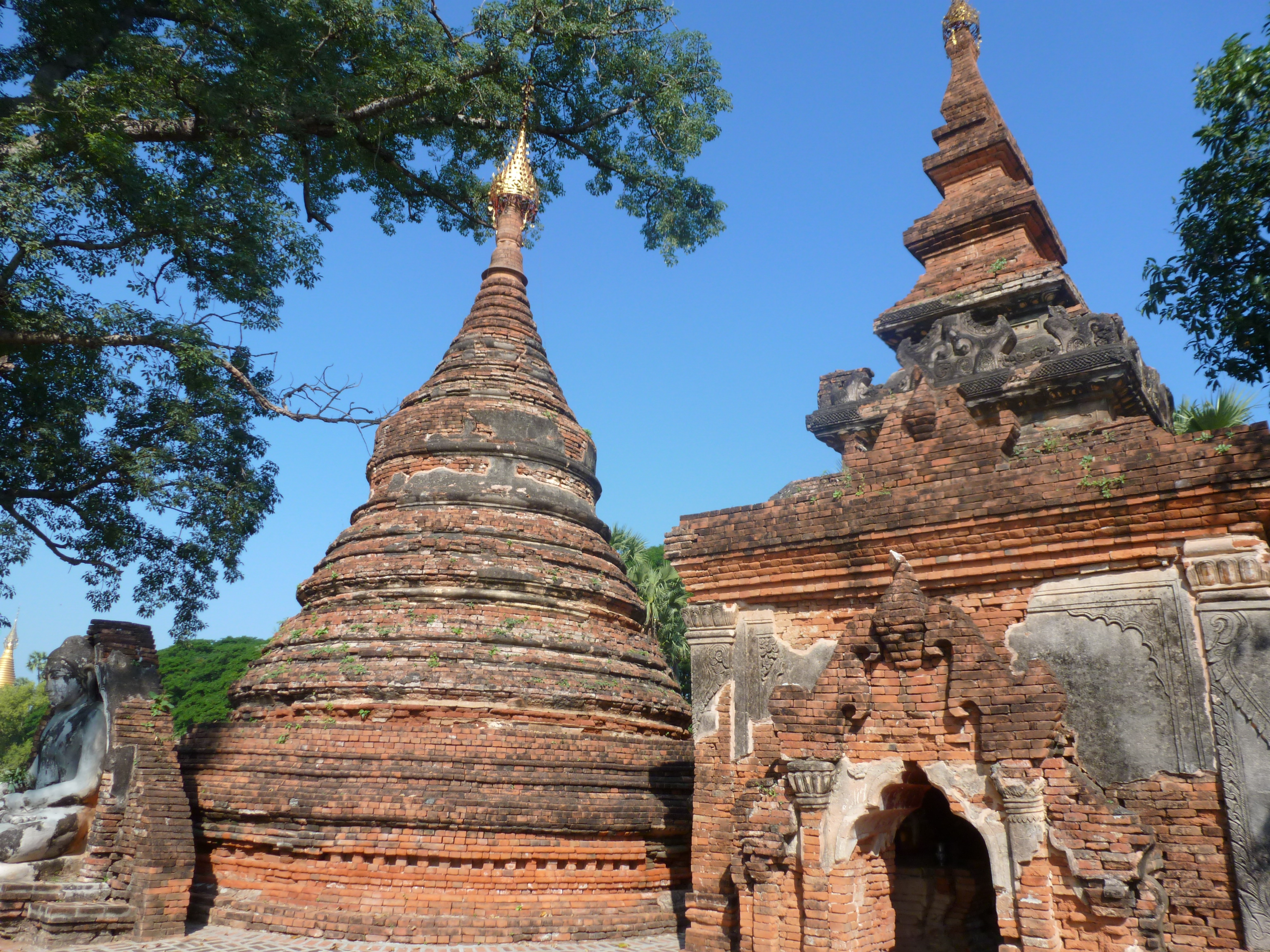
Yadana Hsimi closeup

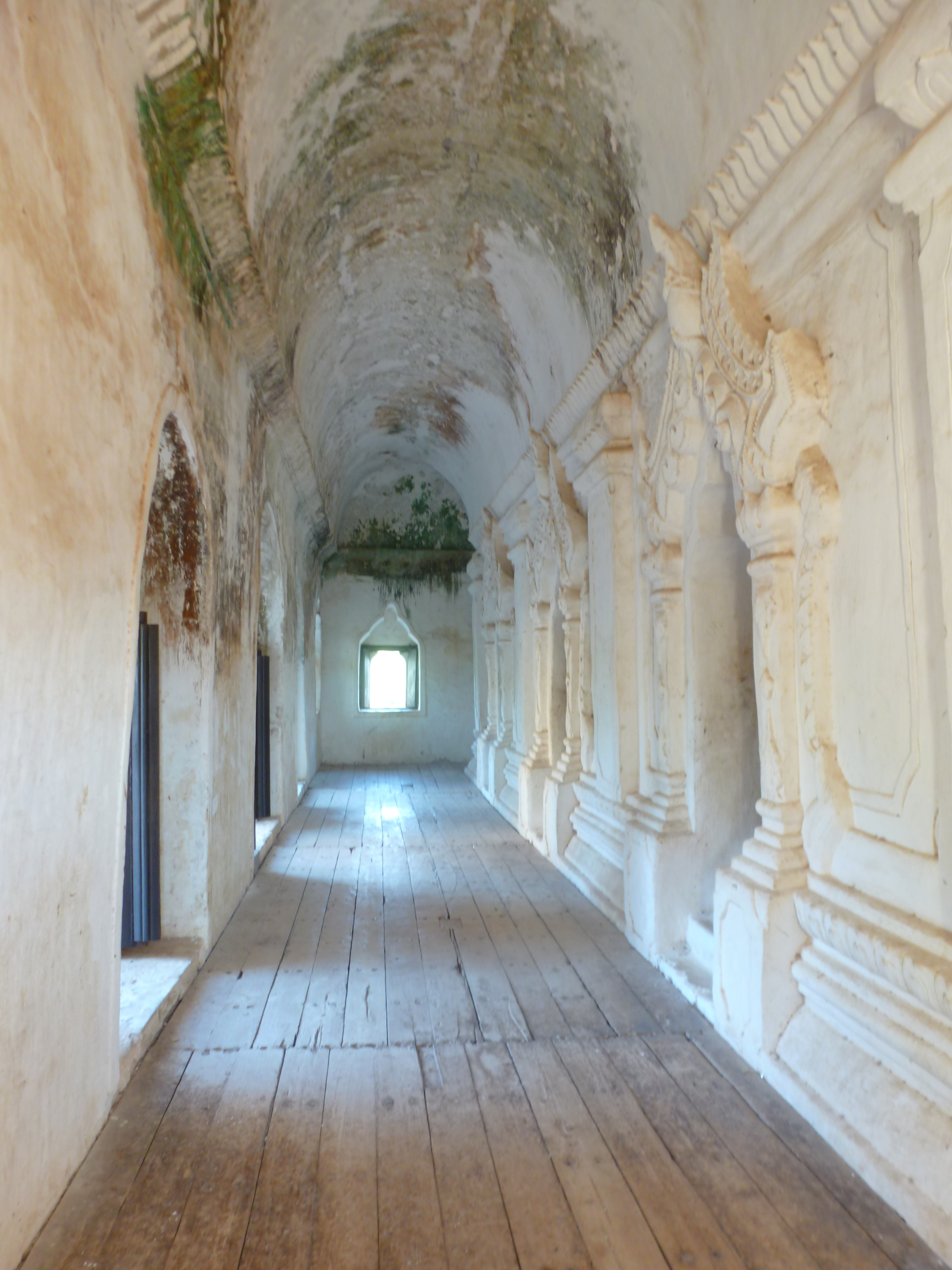
Me Nu Ok Kyaung interior hallway

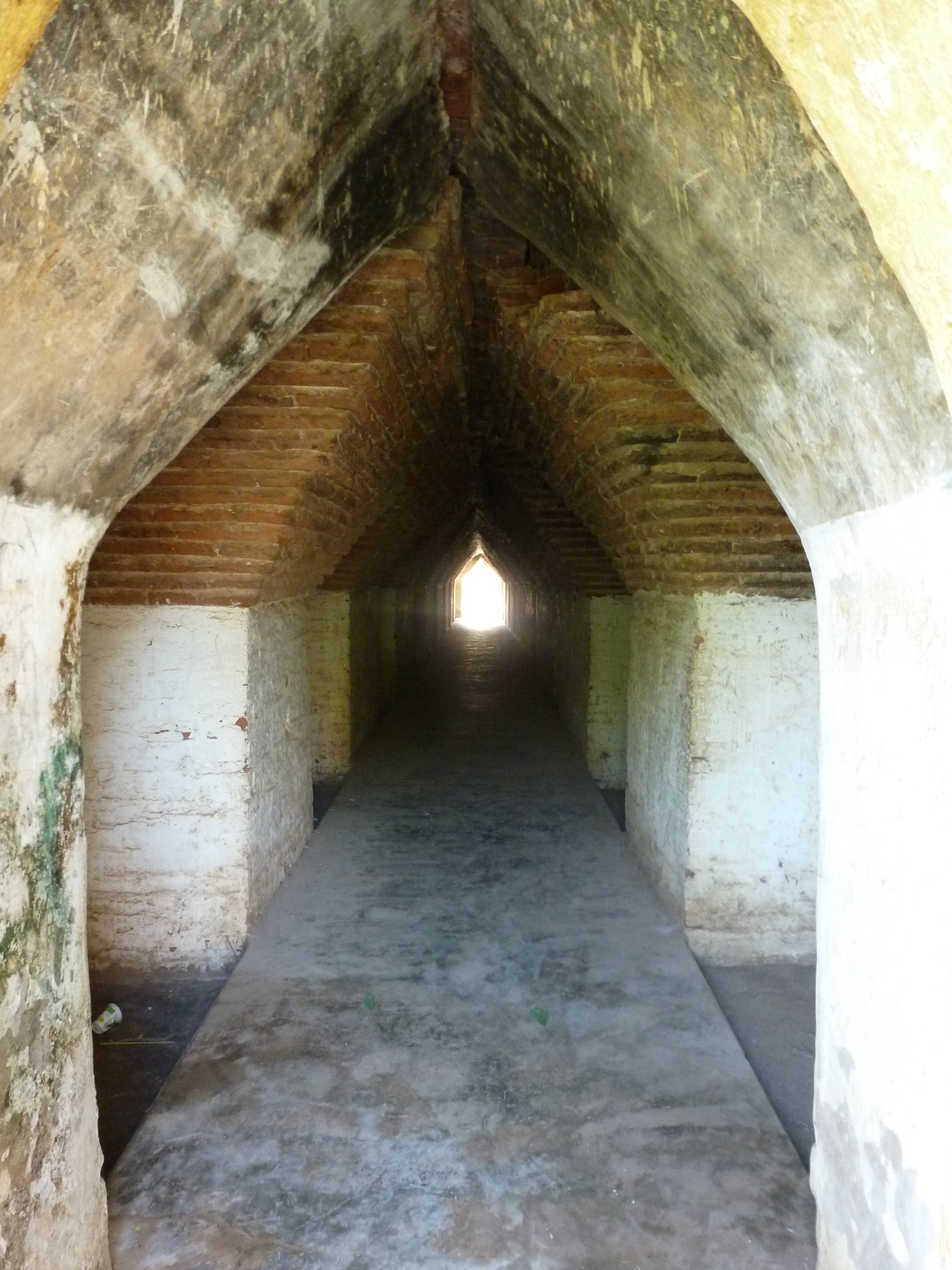
Foundation pillars and chambers of Me Nu Ok Kyaung

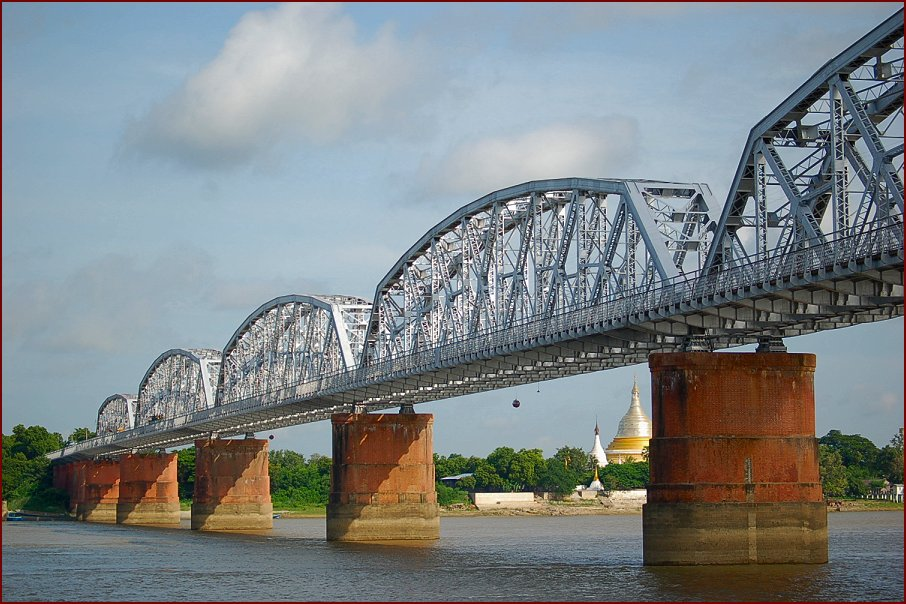
Old Ava Bridge

== Notes ==
Inwa
Preceded by Pinya	Capital of Ava Kingdom; 26 February 1365 – 22 January 1555	Succeeded by Pegu
Preceded by Pegu	Capital of Burma; 19 December 1599 – 14 May 1613	Succeeded by Pegu
Preceded by Pegu	Capital of Burma; 25 January 1635 – 23 March 1752	Succeeded by Shwebo
Preceded by Sagaing	Capital of Burma; 23 July 1765 – 13 May 1783	Succeeded by Amarapura
Preceded by Amarapura	Capital of Burma; 22 November 1821 – 10 February 1842	Succeeded by Amarapura
