= Maha Aungmye Bonzan Monastery =

Ancient Buddhist Monastery in Myanmar

- မဟာအောင်မြေဘုံစံကျောင်း
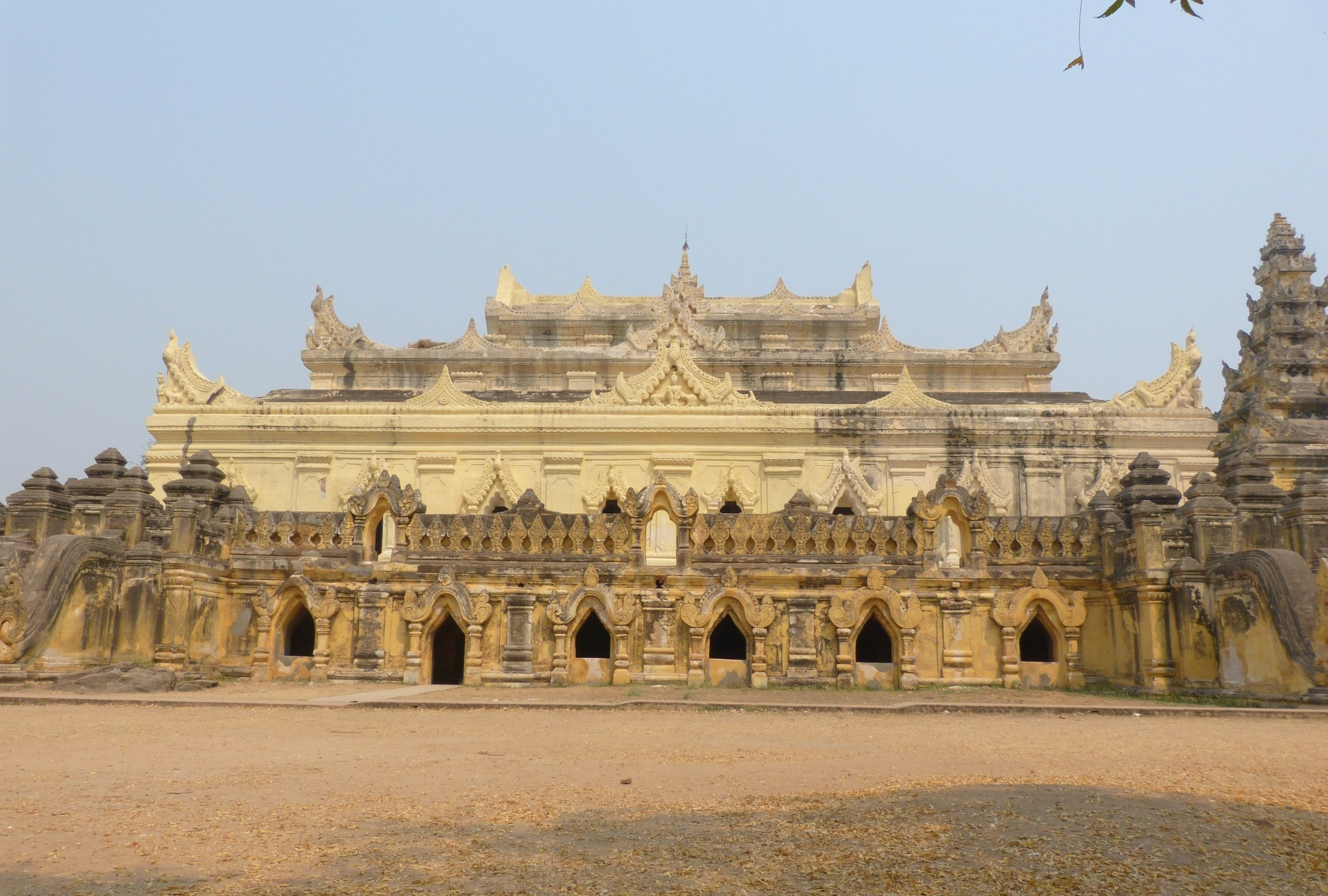
- Before 2025 earthquake

- Location within Myanmar

Religion
- Affiliation: Theravada Buddhism

Location
- Country: Inwa, Mandalay Region, Burma
- Interactive map of Maha Aungmye Bonzan Monastery
- Coordinates: 21.85856265593676°N 95.98420773897945°E

Architecture
- Founder: Nanmadaw Me Nu
- Groundbreaking: 3 December 1822; 203 years ago; 5th waning of Nadaw 1184 ME
- Completed: 29 January 1828; 198 years ago; 13th waxing of Tabodwe 1189 ME

Specifications
- Length: 58.5 m (192 ft)
- Width: 34.1 m (112 ft)
- Height (max): 28.7 m (94 ft)

Maha Aungmye Bonzan Monastery (Burmese: မဟာအောင်မြေဘုံစံကျောင်း), commonly known as the Me Nu Brick Monastery (Burmese: မယ်နုအုတ်ကျောင်း), is a historic Buddhist monastery in Inwa, Mandalay Region, Myanmar (formerly Burma).

At the behest of its donor Queen Nanmadaw Me Nu, the construction of the brick monastery began on 3 December 1822, and was officially consecrated on 29 January 1828. The queen donated the monastery to her religious preceptor, the Nyaunggan Sayadaw U Po. She later offered it to the 2nd Nyaunggan Sayadaw U Bok. The monastery was damaged by the earthquake of 1838 but was repaired in 1873 by his daughter Hsinbyumashin. This monastery is one of the finest specimens of Burmese architecture during the mid-Konbaung Period. Its architecture is in simulation of wooden monasteries with multiple roofs and a prayer hall of seven-tiered superstructure.

The structure collapsed during the 2025 Myanmar earthquake.

== See also ==
- List of structures and infrastructure affected by the 2025 Myanmar earthquake
- Kyaung

== Bibliography ==
- Maung Maung Tin, U (2004) [1905]. Konbaung Set Maha Yazawin (in Burmese). Vol. 1–3. Yangon: Department of Universities History Research, University of Yangon.
