= Nanmadaw Me Nu =

Chief queen consort of Burma 1819–37

Nanmadaw Me Nu နန်းမတော် မယ်နု
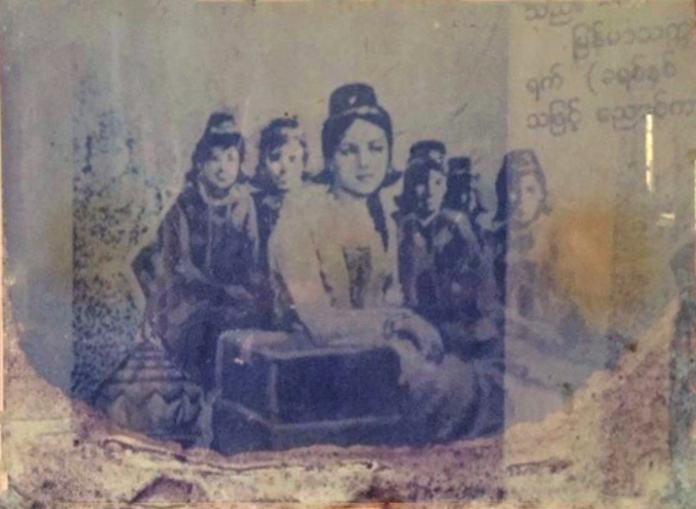

Chief queen consort of Burma
- Tenure: 5 June 1819 – 30 April 1837
- Predecessor: Me Lun Me
- Successor: Thiri Pawara Ti Lawka Maha Yadana Padomma Dewi

Duchess of Toungoo
- Tenure: 24 May 1827 – 15 April 1837
- Born: 18 June 1783; Wednesday, 5th waning of First Waso 1145 ME; Ava, Konbaung Burma
- Died: 12 May 1840 (aged 56); Tuesday, 12th waxing of Kason 1202 ME; Amarapura
- Spouse: Bagyidaw (m. 1801)
- Issue: Prince of Palaing; Hsinbyumashin
Names
- Siripavaratiloka Mahāratanadevī သီရိပဝရတိလောက မဟာရတနာဒေဝီ
- House: Konbaung
- Father: Thiha Kyawswa of Shwedaung
- Mother: Daw Nge
- Religion: Theravada Buddhism

Nanmadaw Me Nu (Burmese: နန်းမတော် မယ်နု, pronounced [náɰ̃mədɔ̀ mɛ̀ nṵ]; 18 June 1783 – 12 May 1840), commonly known by her regnal title Thiri Pavara Mahayazeinda Yadana Dewi (Burmese: သီရိပဝရ မဟာရာဇိန္ဒာ ရတနာဒေဝီ; Pali: Sīri pavara mahārajindā ratanadevī) was the chief queen consort of King Bagyidaw of the Konbaung dynasty of Burma from 1819 to 1837. Her nickname "Nanmadaw" comes from her status as Nanh madaw Miphayah Khaung-gyii (lit. Queen of the Main Palace).

The chief queen was the leader of the powerful palace faction that advocated for war with the British. Even after the disastrous First Anglo-Burmese War (1824–1826), she consolidated more power as her husband withdrew from governing. She and her brother Prince Maung O of Salin became the de facto rulers of the kingdom until Bagyidaw was overthrown in 1837. The queen and her brother were executed on the order of the new king Tharrawaddy Min in 1840.

== Background ==
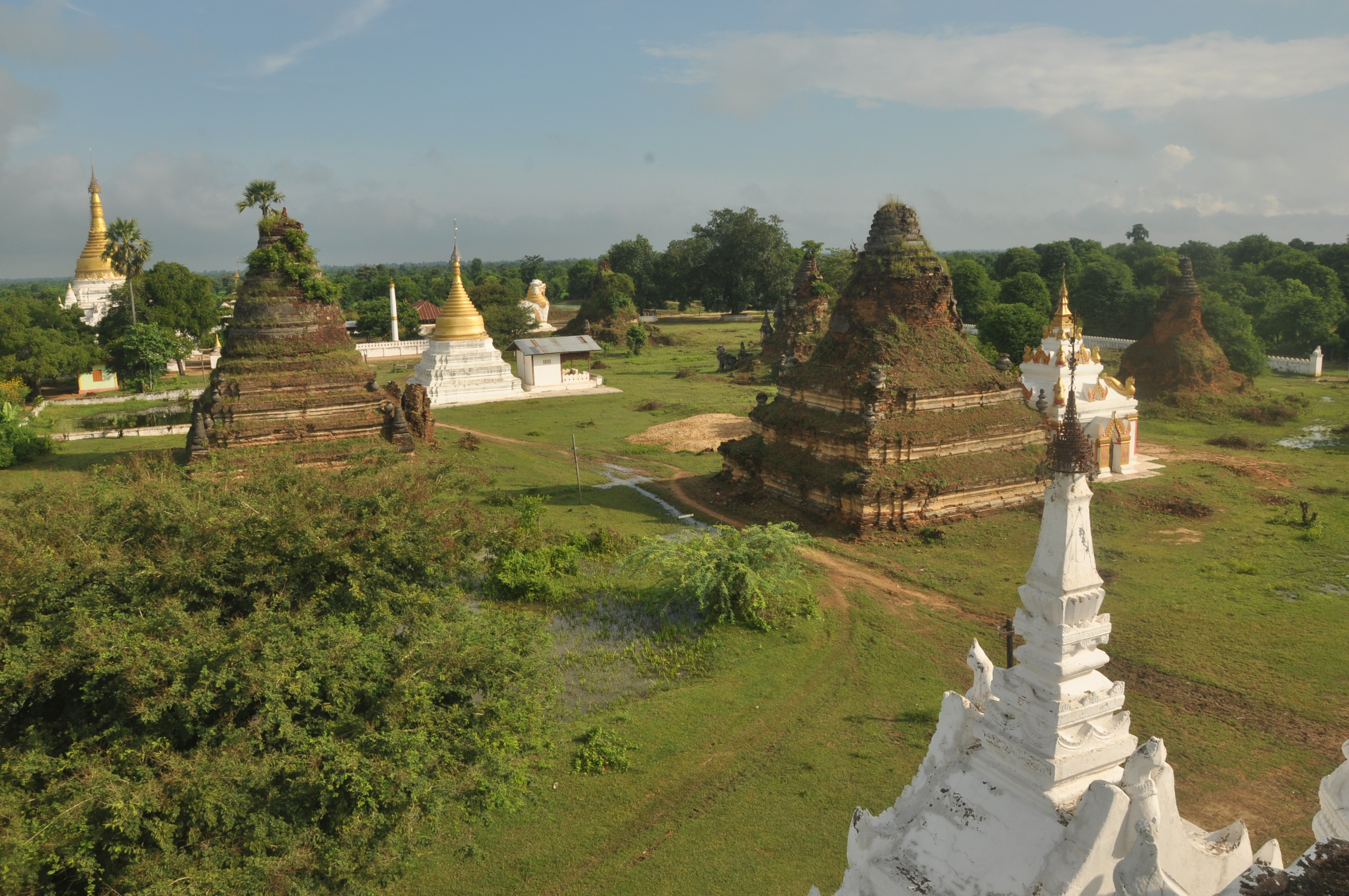
Phalangon where Me Nu's relative lived

Me Nu was born Shin Min Nu on 18 June 1783 at Ava. She was the great-granddaughter of the hero Bala Thaman, who founded the Phalangon Village, 5 miles northwest of present-day Khin-U, and was assigned to the local fort to help guard against the Manipuris during the reign of King Mahadhammaraza Dipadi of the Nyaungyan dynasty. She had a brother, Maung O. According to historian Hmawbi Saya Thein, it is believed that U Hlok had three children: Me Pu, Maung O, and Me Nu. However, the royal chronicle only mentions Me Nu and Maung O. There is a dispute between Me Nu and Maung O regarding their birth order, with conflicting accounts. According to bell and stone inscriptions of Konbaung, it is suggested that Me Nu was the elder, and Maung O the younger. Her father, Thiha Kyawswa U Hlok, was the son of Thakhin Mun, who was the third daughter of Bala Thaman. Her mother, Daw Nge, was a native of Phalangon village. During her naming ceremony, her uncle Maha Kyawhtin U Lun, who was the minister of civil service, named her "Me Nu" because of her exceptional beauty and her delicate and gentle demeanor.

== Selection as crown princess ==
During the reign of King Bodawpaya, a falcon took 11-year-old Me Nu's sarong as she was bathing, dropping the garment in the left wing of the southern royal palace. When the king searched for the owner of the sarong, she soon arrived in his presence. After royal officials had conducted an investigation, the king offered her a position as lady-in-waiting at the palace.

Prince Sagaing became crown prince on 6 April 1809. At the end of 1812, his consort, Hsinbyume, gave birth to Prince Nyaungyan, but died seven days later. Prince Sagaing married Me Nu in 1813, and she became the crown princess. This granted her the rights to nine villages (five of them salt farms), thirty horses, 3,000 pe of land, and the taxes from four kinds of products.

== Chief queen ==
Prince Sagaing became the seventh king of the Konbaung dynasty on 7 June 1819, making Me Nu his chief queen and giving her the title of Thiri Pavara Mahayazeinda Yadana Dewi. Her husband also gave the title of "Thado Minhla Kyawhtin" and granted the appanage of Salin to her brother, Maung O.

Me Nu had three children by Bagyidaw. Their eldest daughter died young, and their son, the Prince of Palaing, died in April 1804 at age 10 due to chickenpox. Their remaining daughter, Princess Supayagale, became Queen Hsinbyumashin; she was the wife of King Mindon and mother of Burma's last queen, Supayalat.

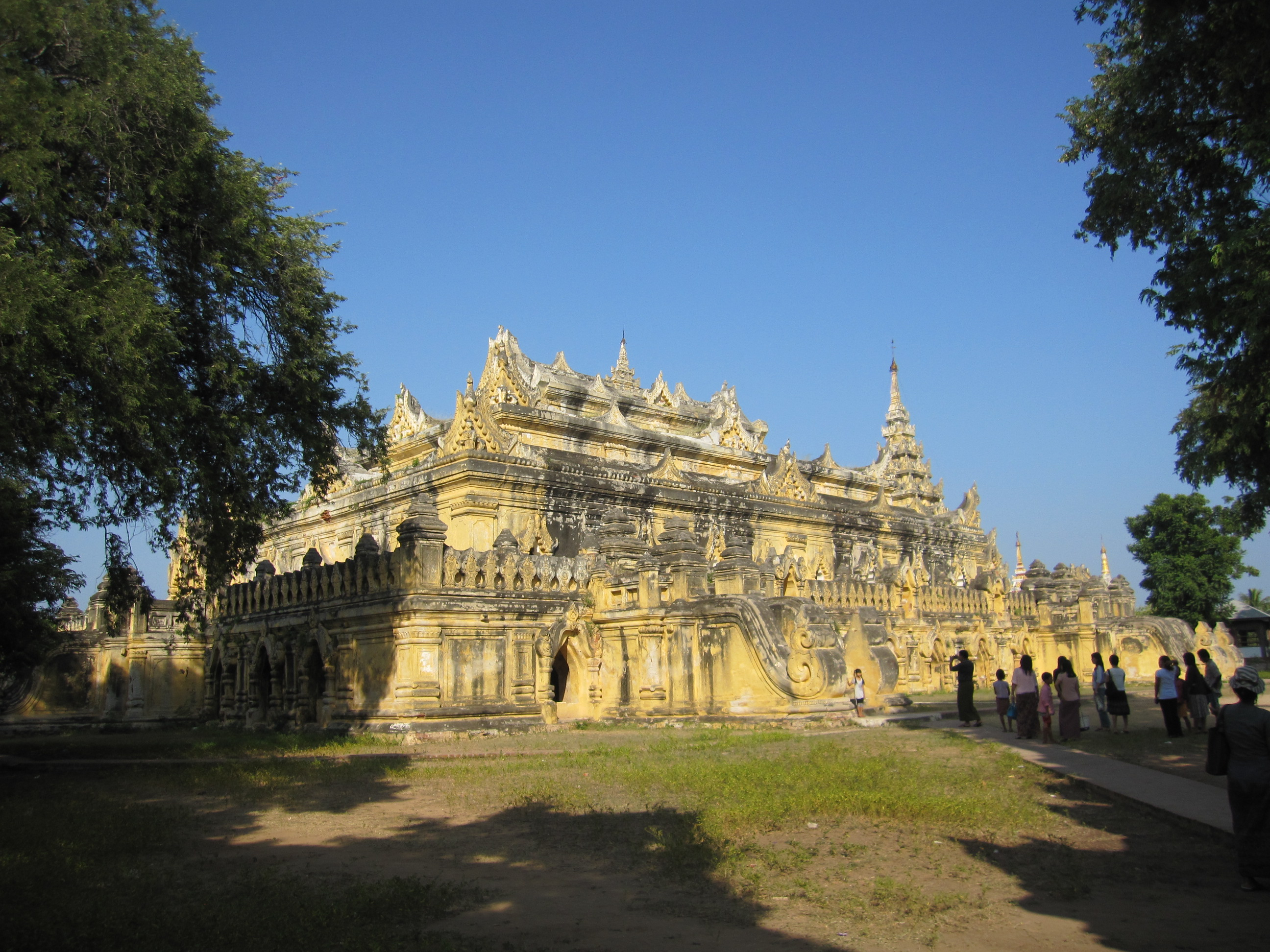
The Queen's Brick Monastery

== Increasing power and downfall ==
Bagyidaw favored Me Nu, and she rose to power in the court. Together with the king, she sat on the throne and arranged the court affairs. Alongside her brother and General Maha Bandula, she advocated for war with the British.

General Maha Bandula died in Danubyu, and the British troops occupied the Yandabo, 40 miles from the royal capital. The Treaty of Yandabo was signed on 24 February 1826, which ended the First Anglo-Burmese War (1824–1826). Due to the defeat of the war, 1 billion Burmese kyats of compensation had to be paid. Lacking money, Me Nu sold her jewelry and paid the first installment of compensation.

After the disastrous First Anglo-Burmese War (1824–1826) left the country crippled, Bagyidaw became increasingly reclusive, afflicted by bouts of depression and could not handle the administration of the state. Me Nu and Maung O became the de facto rulers of the country, and they were much feared due to their tyrannical policies. She was granted Toungoo (Taungoo) as an appanage on 24 May 1827. (Note: 14th waning of Kason 1189 ME (24 May 1827))

In February 1837, Crown Prince Tharrawaddy, brother of Bagyidaw, raised a rebellion. By the end of April, (Note: 12th waning of Kason 1199 ME (30 April 1837)) he had forced Bagyidaw to abdicate in his favor. Tharrawaddy put his brother under house arrest and sentenced Me Nu and her brother to death. On 12 May 1840, (Note: 12th waxing of Kason 1202 ME (12 May 1840)) the queen was executed by drowning. Her brother Maung O, his wife, and their two children, as well as her entire inner circle, (Note: Also executed were: (1) her private secretary Nga Pa-Yauk, (2) Mayor Nga Yay of Myolat, (3) Royal Herald Nga Shwe Tha, (4) Commander of the Pakhan Regiment Nga Yan Min, (5) royal scribe Nga Pyo, (6) Mayor Nga Ku of Toungoo, (7) Royal Guard Nga Tun Nyo) were also executed.

== Religious endowments ==
Me Nu established the Me Nu Oak-kyaung (Brick Monastery) in 1828 for the royal abbot Nyaunggan Sayadaw U Po. It was later offered to the second Nyaunggan Sayadaw U Bok. The monastery was damaged by the earthquake of 1838 but was repaired in 1873 by Hsinbyumashin. The monastery consists of a series of wooden monasteries with multiple roofs and a prayer hall with a seven-tiered superstructure.

Her other donations include:

- Maha Meru Makuṭa Jhaṇḍa Rājā Bell at Pahtodawgyi
- Maha Aungmye Bonzan Monastery
- Maha Zeya Pahta Brick Bridge in Inwa
- Phalangon Pagoda

== Bibliography ==
- Maung Maung Tin, U (2004) [1905]. Konbaung Set Maha Yazawin (in Burmese). Vol. 1–3. Yangon: Department of Universities History Research, University of Yangon.
- Myint-U, Thant (2006). The River of Lost Footsteps—Histories of Burma. Farrar, Straus and Giroux. ISBN 978-0-374-16342-6.

Nanmadaw Me Nu Konbaung dynasty Born: 18 June 1783 Died: 12 May 1840
Royal titles
Preceded by Shin Paik Thaung	Chief queen consort of Burma; 5 June 1819 – 30 April 1837	Succeeded by Thiri Pawara Ti Lawka Maha Yadana Padomma Dewi
