= Lawka Tharahpu Pagoda =

Buddhist pagoda in Dawei, Myanmar

Coordinates: 14°02′37.1″N 98°13′52.3″E

- လောကသရဖူဘုရား
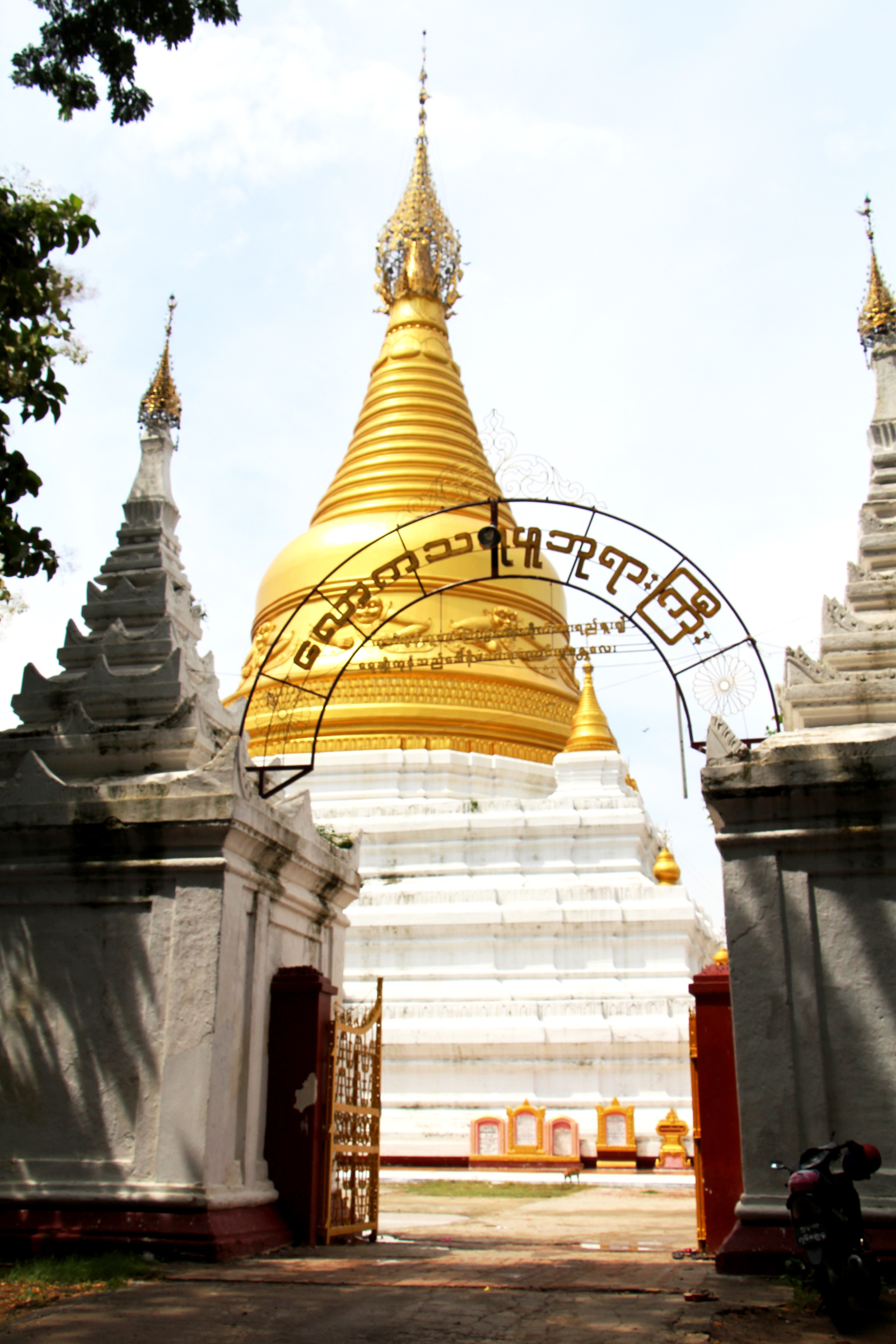

Religion
- Affiliation: Buddhist
- Status: Open

Location
- Location: Dawei, Tanintharyi Region,
- Country: Myanmar
- Interactive map of Lawka Tharahpu Pagoda

Lawka Tharahpu Pagoda (Burmese: လောကသရဖူဘုရား) is a Buddhist pagoda in Dawei, in the Tanintharyi Region of southern Myanmar. The temple is notable for a 74 m (243 ft) sculpture of a reclining Buddha located on the pagoda's grounds. The pagoda is a popular tourist destination.
