= Phalangon =

Phalangon ဖလံဂုဏ်
- Village
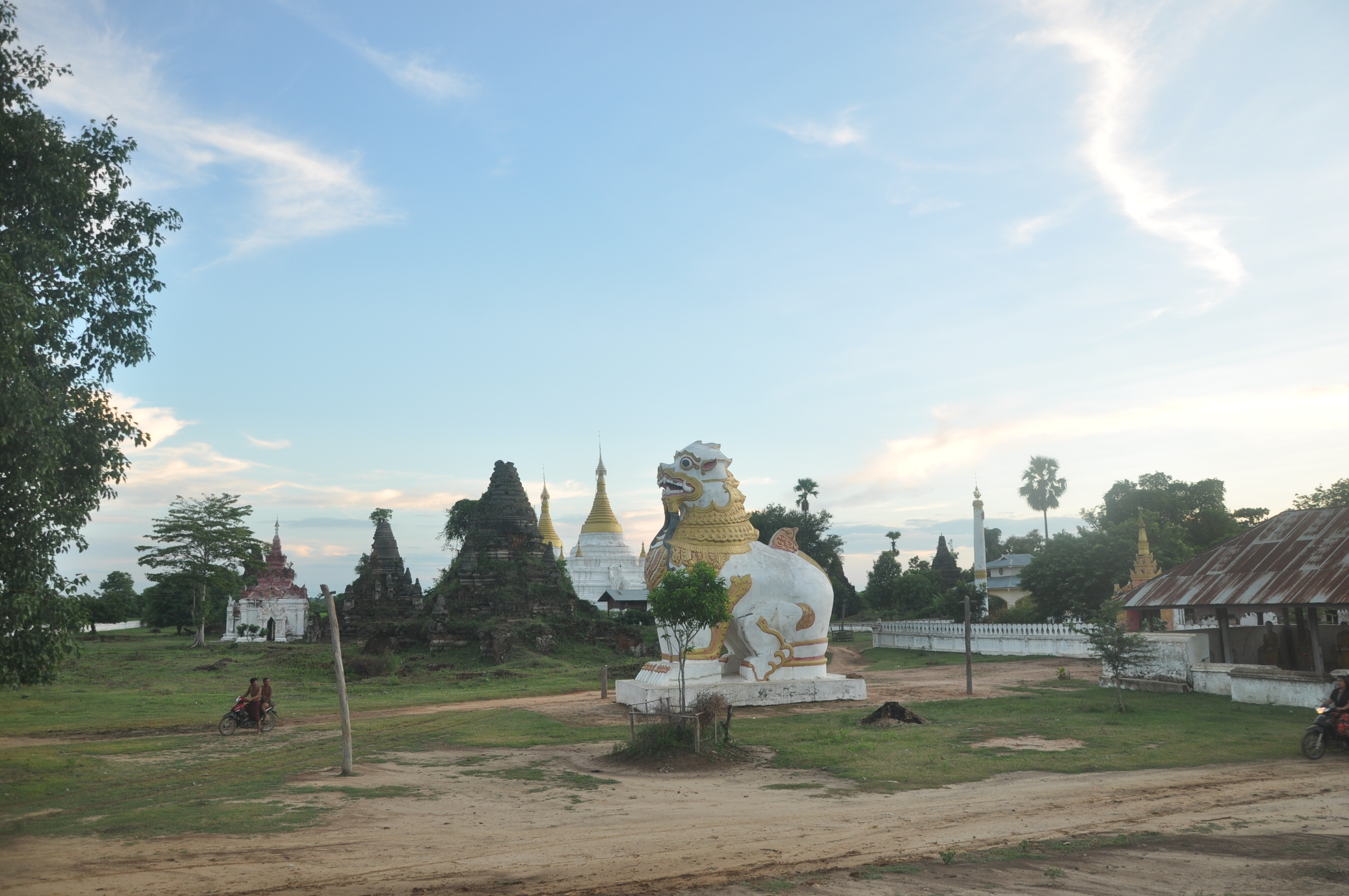

- Location in Burma
- Coordinates: 22.810792°N 95.369415°E
- Country: Myanmar
- Region: Sagaing Region
- District: Shwebo District
- Township: Ye-U Township
- Time zone: UTC+6.30 (MST)

Phalangon (Burmese: ဖလံဂုဏ်ရွာ) is a village in Ye-U Township, Sagaing Region, Myanmar. The village is the home to the chief queen Nanmadaw Me Nu and founded by her great-grand father Bala Thaman who was posted to the Phalangon village fort during the reign of King Mahadhammaraza Dipadi of Nyaungyan dynasty to guard against the danger of Manipurs.

== Gallery ==
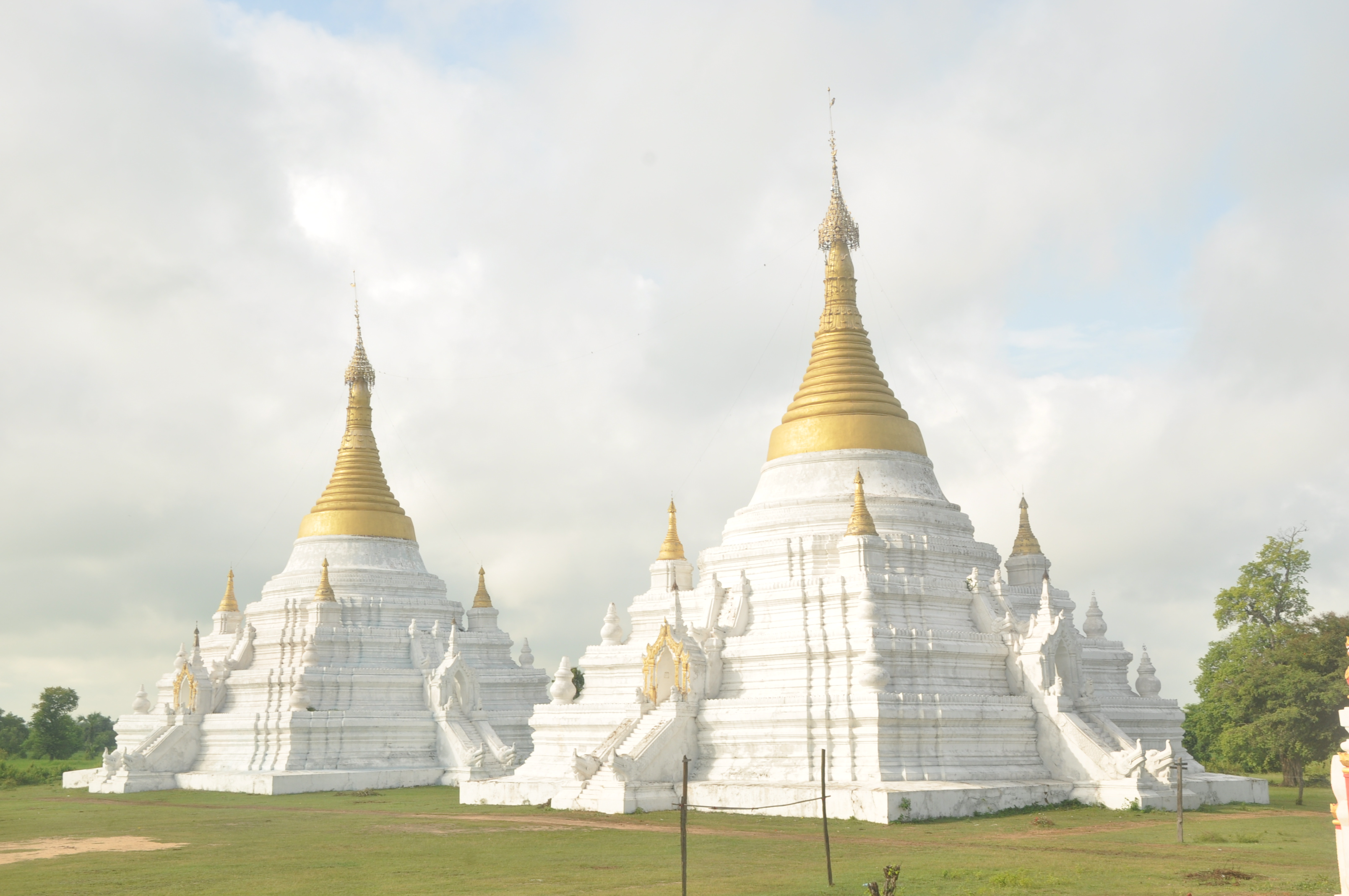
Donated by Nanmadaw Me Nu in Phalangon

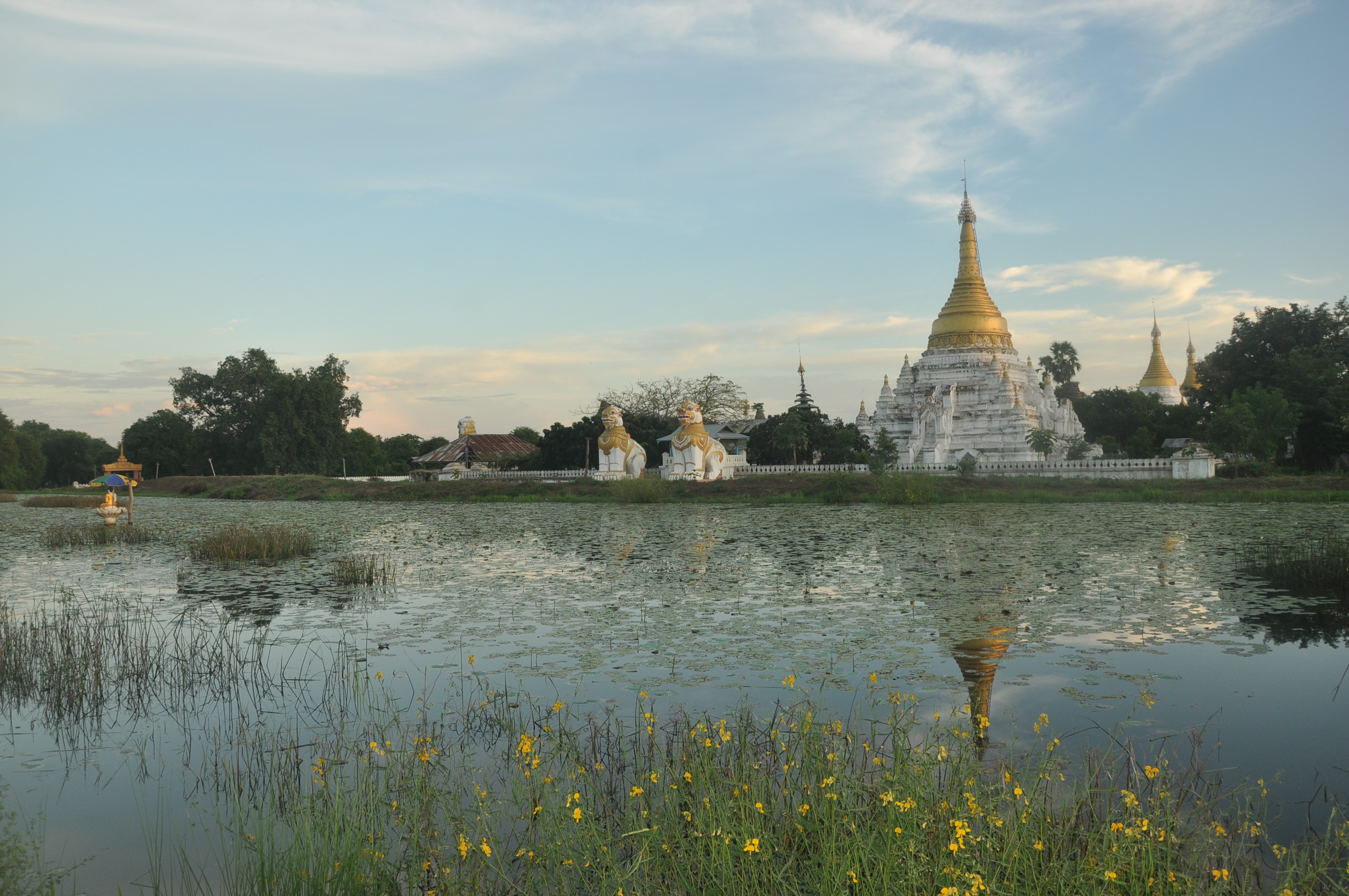
Lake view in Phalangon

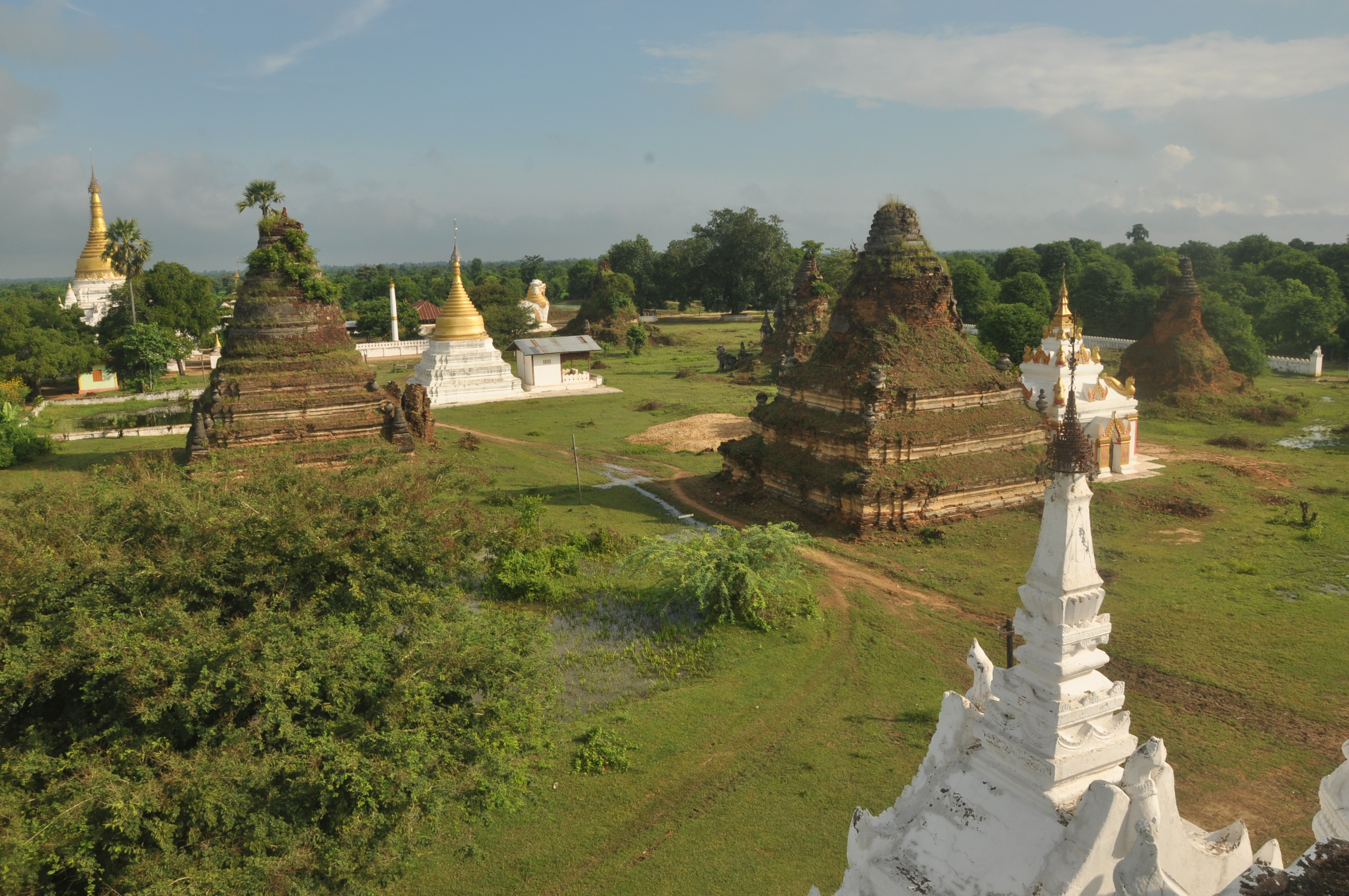
Old Pagoda in Phalangon

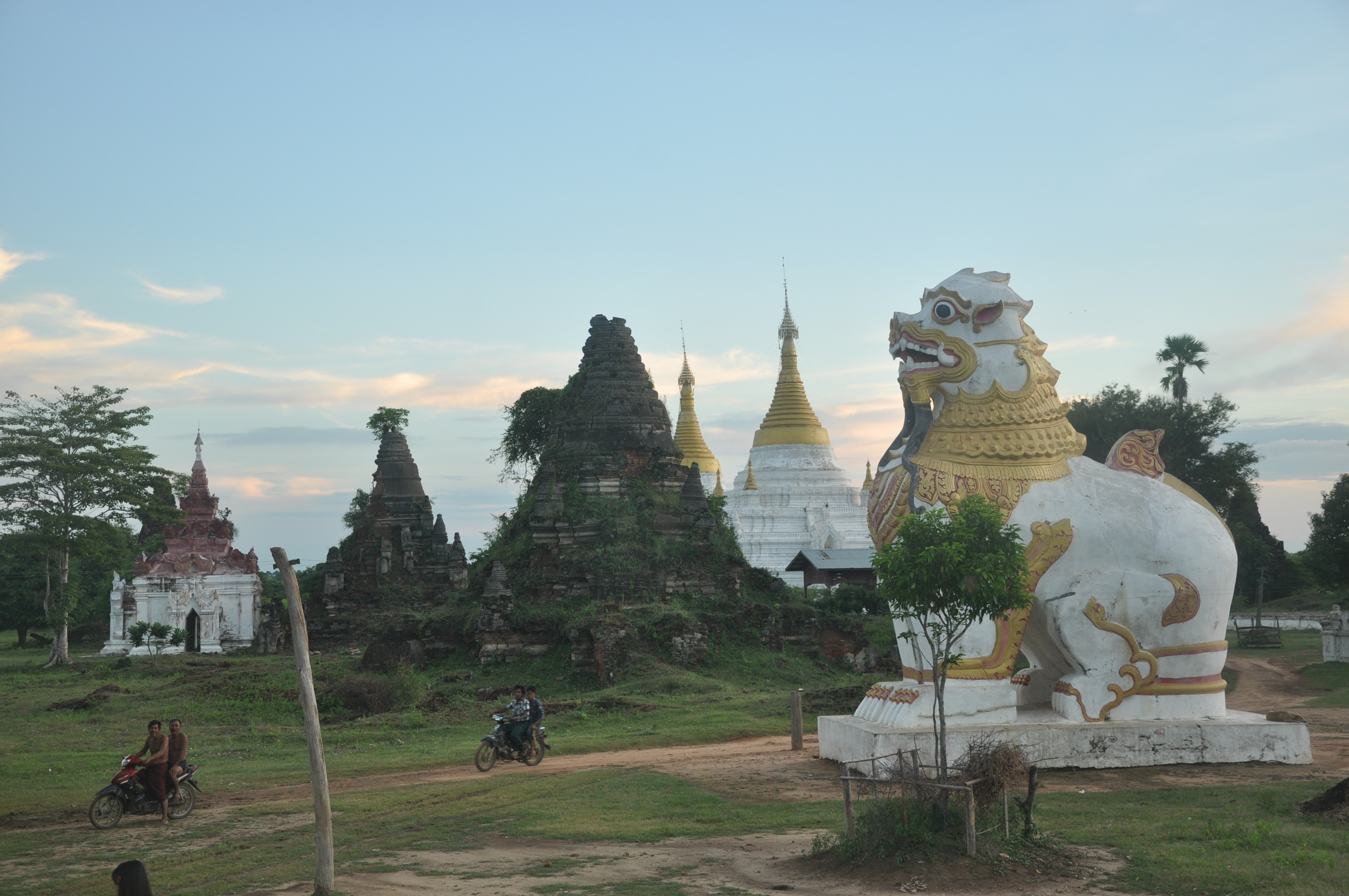
Pagoda in Phalangon

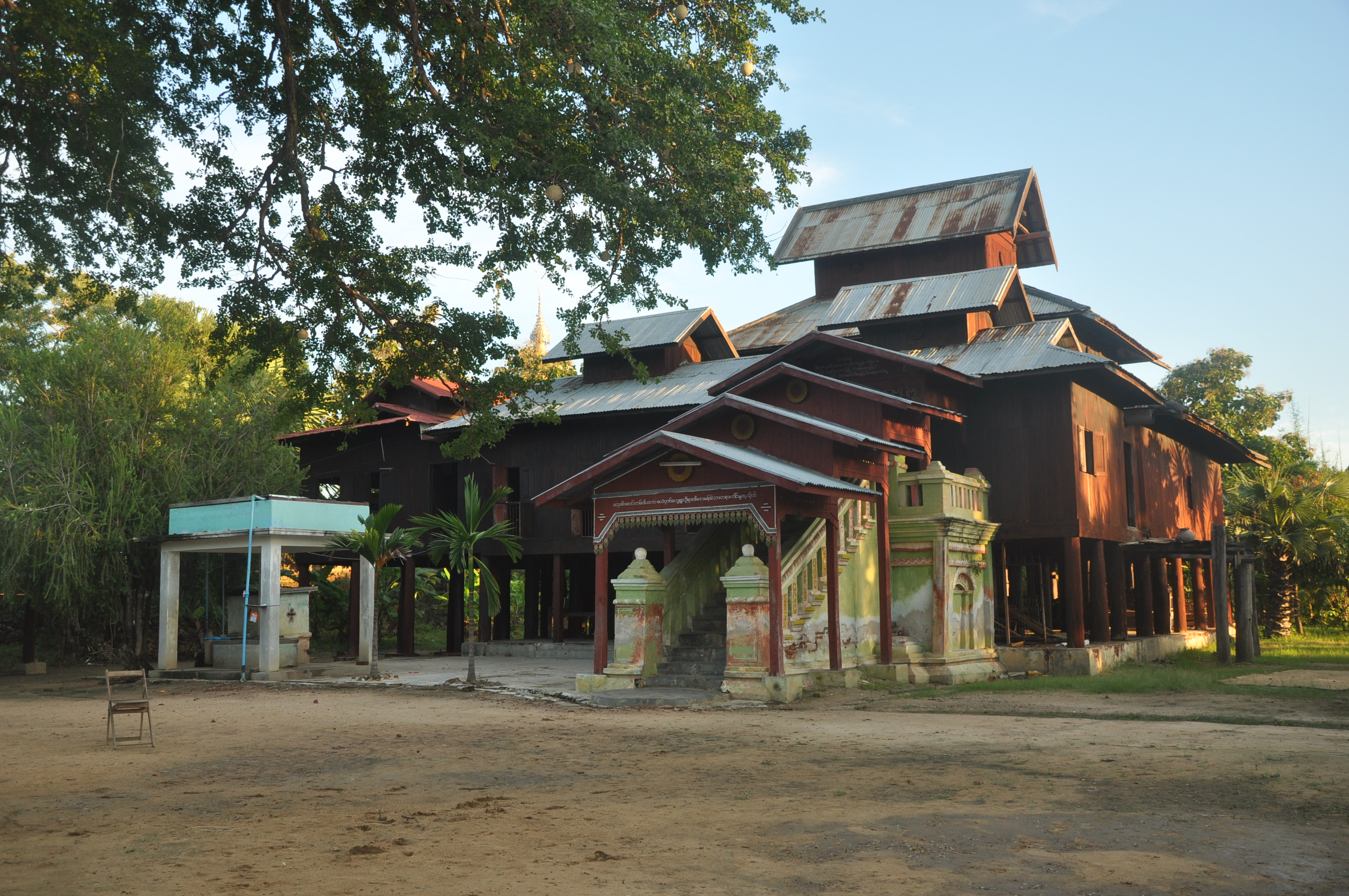
Temple in Phalangon

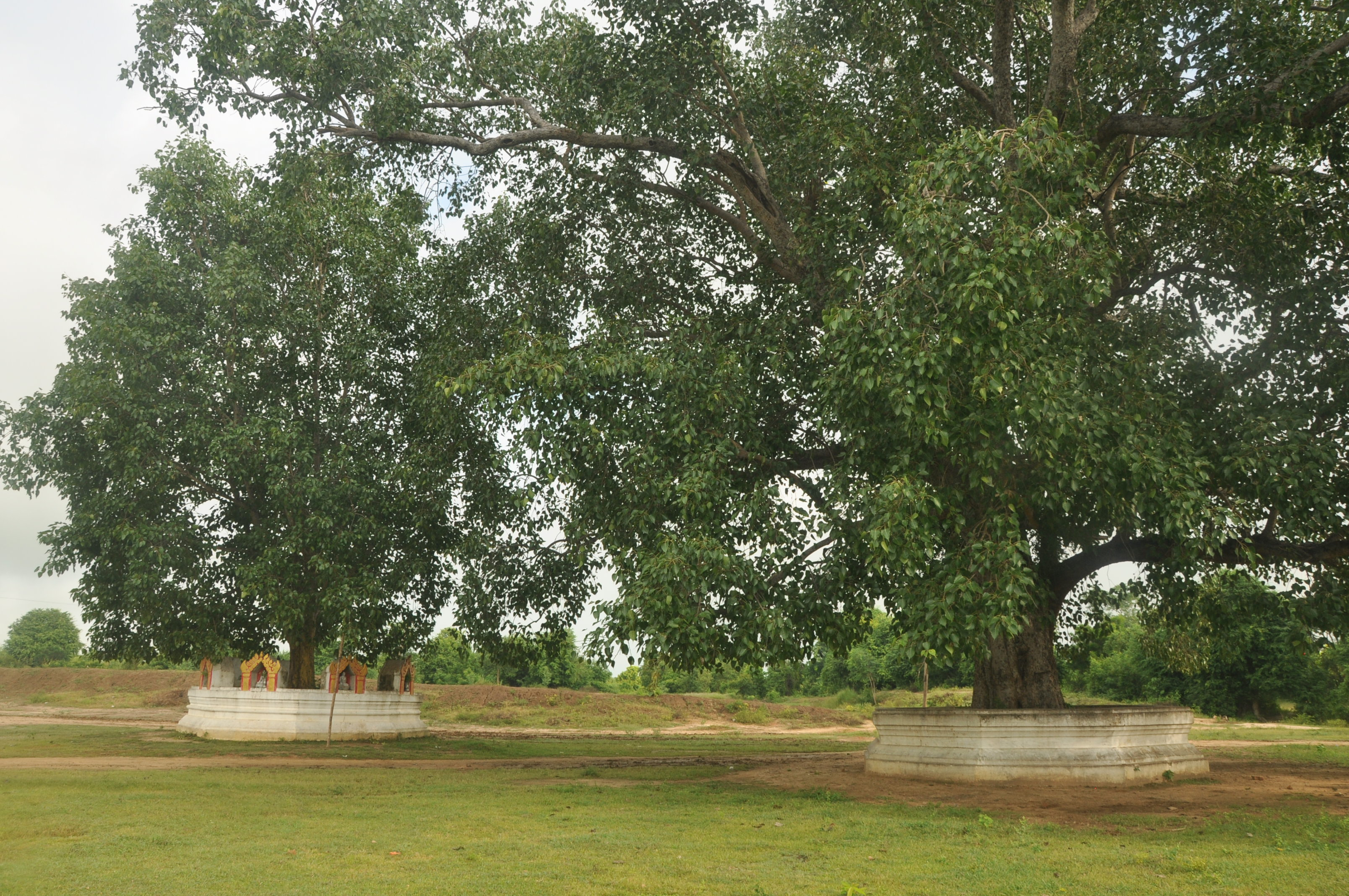
Tree in Phalangon

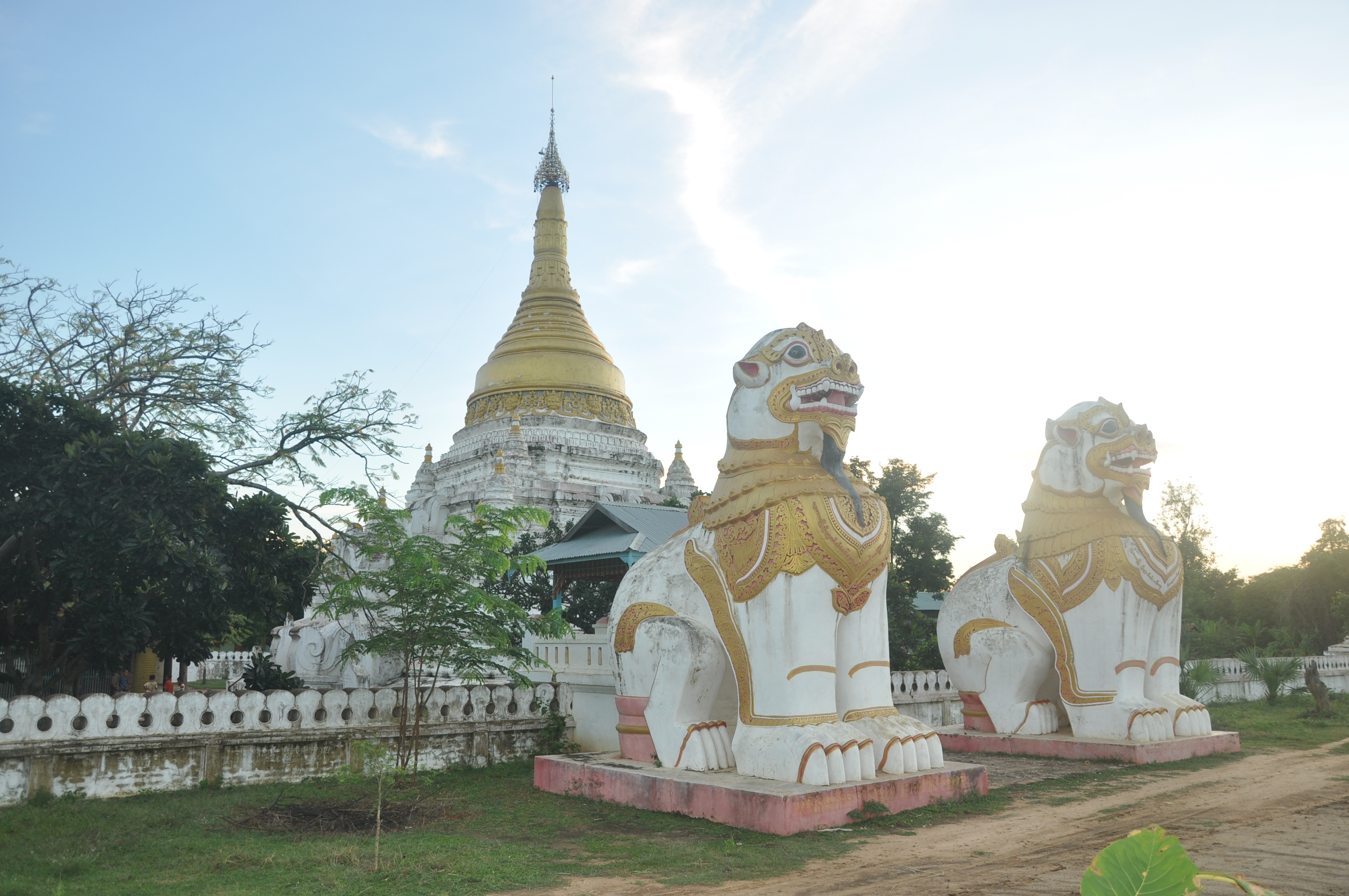
Two Lion in Phalangon

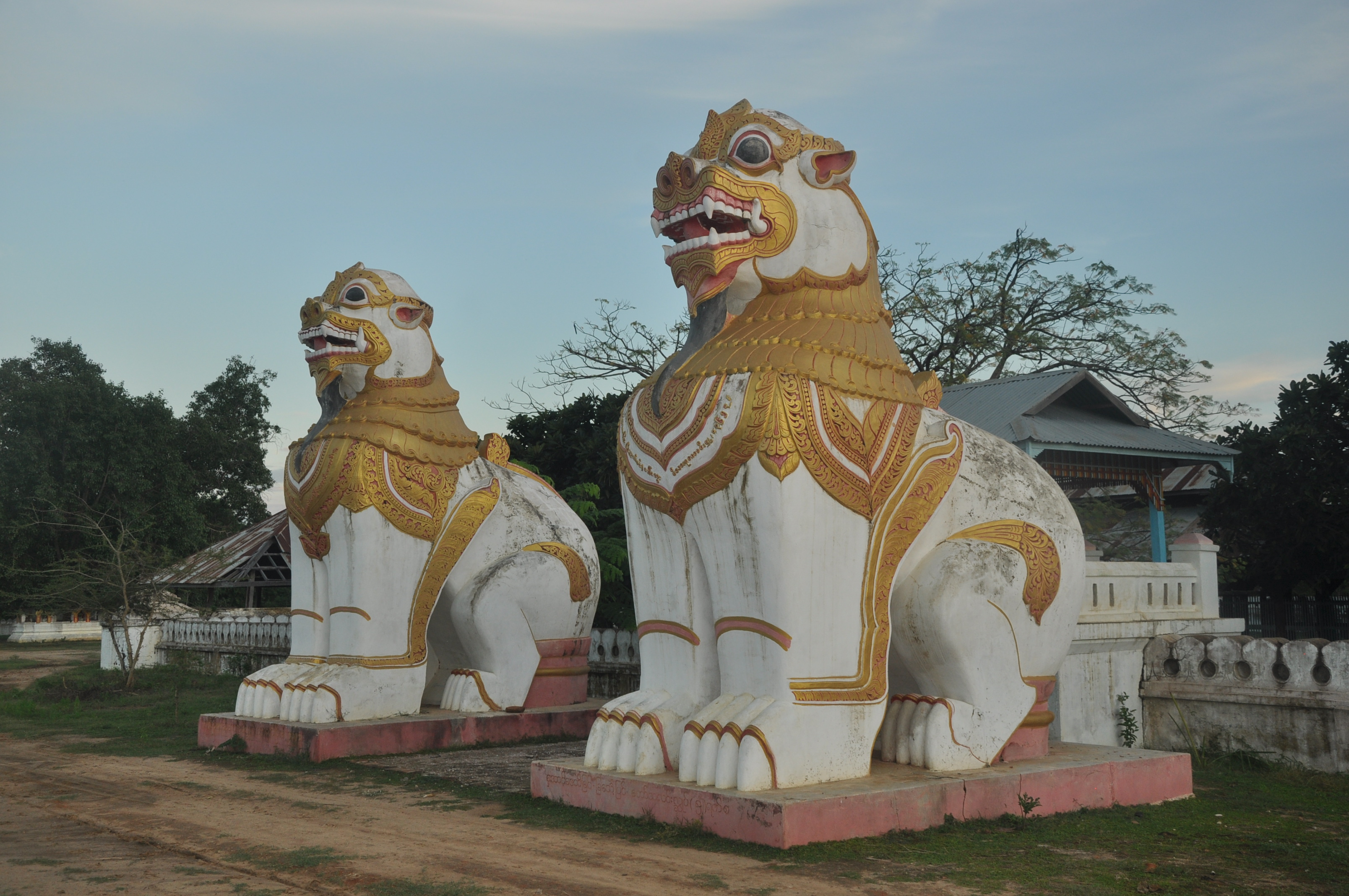
Two Lions in Phalangon
