= Burmese–Siamese War (1792–1794) =

Military conflict

- Part of the Burmese–Siamese wars
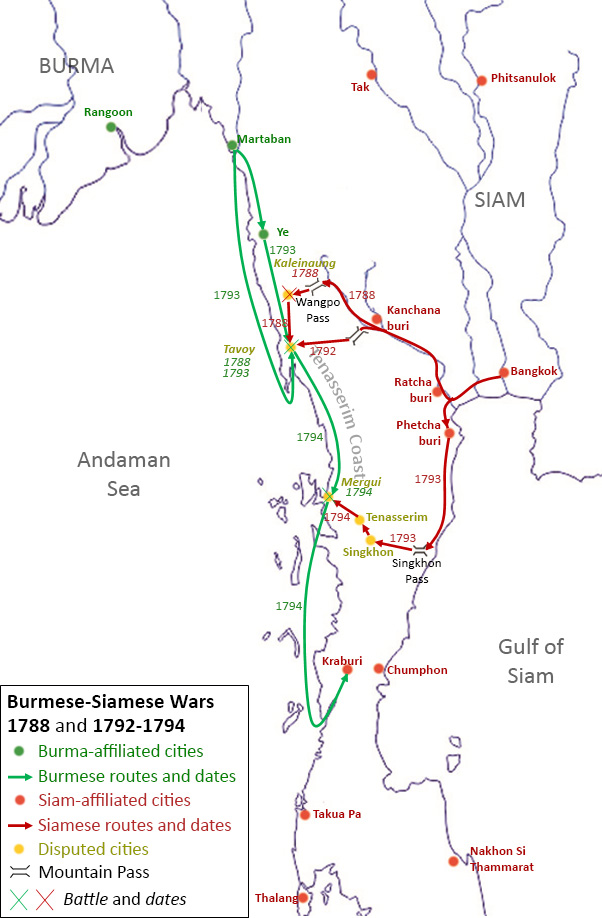
Date	March 1792 – March 1794
Location	Tenasserim Coast
Result	Burmese victory: Tenasserim remained within the Burmese sphere of influence, Tenasserim Coast depopulated

Belligerents
Konbaung dynasty (Burma)	Rattanakosin Kingdom (Siam)

Commanders and leaders
Bodawpaya; Prince Thado Minsaw; Nemyo Kyawdin Thihathu; Wunyi Maha Zeyathura; Nemyo Gonna Kyawthu; Mingyi Thinkaya; Balayanta Kyawdin	Rama I Prince Maha Sura Singhanat; Chao Phraya Mahasena Pli †; Chao Phraya Rattanapipit; Phraya Chasaenyakorn Thurian; Phraya Yommaraj Bunnag

Strength
50,000	40,000

The Burmese–Siamese War (1792–1794) or the Siamese Invasion of Tavoy was the conflict between the Kingdom of Burma under Konbaung dynasty and the Kingdom of Siam under the Chakri dynasty over the town of Tavoy and the Tenasserim Coast.

Siam under King Rama I attempted to claim the Tenasserim Coast and the towns of Tavoy and Mergui, which were former possessions of Siam during the times of Kingdom of Ayutthaya. The defection of Burmese governor of Tavoy to Siam in March 1792 gave Siam an opportunity to realize the goals. With Tavoy and Mergui under control, King Rama I planned an expedition into Lower Burma. However, King Bodawpaya of Burma, aiming to keep the Tenasserim Coast in Burmese control, sent his son Prince Thado Minsaw to counter Siamese offensives. The Siamese were soundly defeated in the Battle of Tavoy in January 1794 and retreated.

== Background ==
The Tenasserim Coast had been battlegrounds of the vying for control between Burma and Siam since the sixteenth century. Tenasserim Coast consisted of two parts; the northern part centered on the town of Tavoy and the southern part centered on the town of Tanintharyi (Thai: ตะนาวศรี, RTGS: Tanao Si). At the mouth of the Tenasserim River laid the port city of Mergui, which was an important Siamese trading port during the reign of King Narai. The Tenasserim Coast was known as "Tavoy, Mergui and Tenassserim" in Thai sources. The inhabitants of Tavoy were called "Tavoyan" as a distinct ethnicity and might relate to the Mon people. The inhabitants of Tanintharyi were Siamese or Siamese-Mon mixture. A seventeenth-century account stated that the inhabitants of Mergui were "Burmese, Siamese, Chinese, Indian, Malay and European".

During the Burmese–Siamese War (1568–1569), the Burmese under King Bayinnaung gained control over Tavoy, Tanintharyi and the whole coast from the Siamese. King Naresuan of Siam regained the coast in 1592. Later King Anaukpetlun of the Burmese Toungoo dynasty retook Tavoy. The Tenasserim Coast then became separated into two portions; the northern Tavoy portion under Burmese domination and the southern part, comprising Tanintharyi and Mergui, under Siamese control. This power balance existed for about one hundred years.

The Mon rebellions in the eighteenth century toppled the Burmese Toungoo dynasty and established the Restored Hanthawaddy Kingdom. The Burmese recovered themselves under the Konbaung dynasty who ended the Hanthawaddy Kingdom and realized the importance of keeping Lower Burma and the Tenasserim Coast under control to prevent further Mon rebellions. The Burmese Konbaung dynasty suppressed the Mon people who, in great number, took refuge on the Tenasserim Coast and in Siam. Siam indirectly supported the Mon rebels by providing them with shelters. King Alaungpaya of Konbaung dynasty invaded Siam in the Burmese–Siamese War (1759–60) and conquered Mergui and Tanintharyi. The whole coastline of Tenasserim then came under Burmese control. During the Nine Armies' War (1785-86), King Bodawpaya of Burma used the Tenasserim Coast the base for his expeditions into Siam.

=== Defection of Nemyo Kyawdin to Siam ===
Nemyo Kyawdin the governor of Tavoy (personal name Nga Myat Pyu, known as Myinzaingza in Thai sources), who had successfully defended the town from the invading Siamese, wished for himself to be appointed to the governorship of Martaban. However, King Bodawpaya instead made Minhla Sithu as the governor of Martaban that had authorities over Tavoy. The relations between Nemyo Kyawdin and Minhla Sithu were not good and Minhla Sithu reported to King Bodawpaya. King Bodawpaya ordered Nemyo Kyawdin relieved of his governorship and arrested for trials at Amarapura. When the new governor arrived in Tavoy, Nemyo Kyawdin had him killed. King Bodawpaya declared Nemyo Kyawdin a rebel and arrested his father Metkaya Bo. Myinzaingza Nemyo Kyawdin then decided to defect to the Siamese cause against King Bodawpaya.

Lady Chi, a lost niece of King Rama I (she was a daughter of an elder brother of King Rama I), had been captured as captive and deported to Tavoy during the Fall of Ayutthaya. Nemyo Kyawdin found out her existence. Nemyo Kyawdin wrote a letter inscribed on a gold plate to King Rama I to submit to Siam in March 1792. He also had Lady Chi write another letter to the Siamese king. King Rama I, upon seeing the letters of Nemyo Kyawdin and his niece Lady Chi, was determined to take Tavoy.

== Siamese Invasion of Tavoy (March 1792) ==
King Rama I ordered Phraya Yommaraj Bunnag (known as Paya Runparat in Burmese sources, father of Somdet Chao Phraya Borom Maha Prayurawongse) to lead a Siamese troop of 5,000 men to claim Tavoy. King Rama I and his younger brother Prince Maha Sura Singhanat also marched to Khwae Noi River, Kanchanaburi. Yommaraj Bunnag reached Tavoy and Nemyo Kyawdin came out to submit. Yommaraj Bunnag sent Lady Chi to visit the king at Khwae Noi River. After the reunion the king sent his niece Lady Chi to Bangkok. After Tavoy had come under Siamese control, Setya-u-chi the governor of Mergui also joined the Siamese side. The Tenasserim Coast again came under Siamese rule, albeit briefly.

From Khwae Noi River, Prince Maha Sura Singhanat marched to Tavoy while the king stayed at Kanchanaburi. The prince then proposed that the town of Tavoy should be demolished to prevent the Burmese from using Tavoy as the base for future operations and the Tavoyans be deported to Siam. However, King Rama I refused, saying that he needed Tavoy as his base for his future campaigns into Burma. A Siamese man named Ma informed the prince that Nemyo Kyawdin was going to defect back to the Burmese side. Prince Maha Sura Singhanat then arrested Nemyo Kyawdin and sent him to King Rama I at Kanchanaburi. King Rama I realized that Nemyo Kyawdin's loyalty was doubtful and decided to exile him to Bangkok permanently. Nemyo Kyawdin was moved to settle in Bangkok and Phraya Yommaraj Bunnag took charge of Tavoy.

With Tavoy and Mergui under Siamese rule, King Rama I planned an expedition into Lower Burma. The Siamese troops were drafted from Laos, Cambodia and Southern Siam. The royal plan was to enter Lower Burma with both land and navy forces simultaneously;

- King Rama I would command land forces from Tavoy to Lower Burma. He sent his generals Chao Phraya Mahasena Pli and Chao Phraya Rattanaphiphit ahead as vanguard to Tavoy to join with the forces of Yommaraj Bunnag.
- Prince Maha Sura Singhanat of the Front Palace would command the navy. The prince went to construct the fleet at Theinkun and joined with the fleets of Mergui to sail to Lower Burma in parallel with the land forces.

== Burmese preparations ==
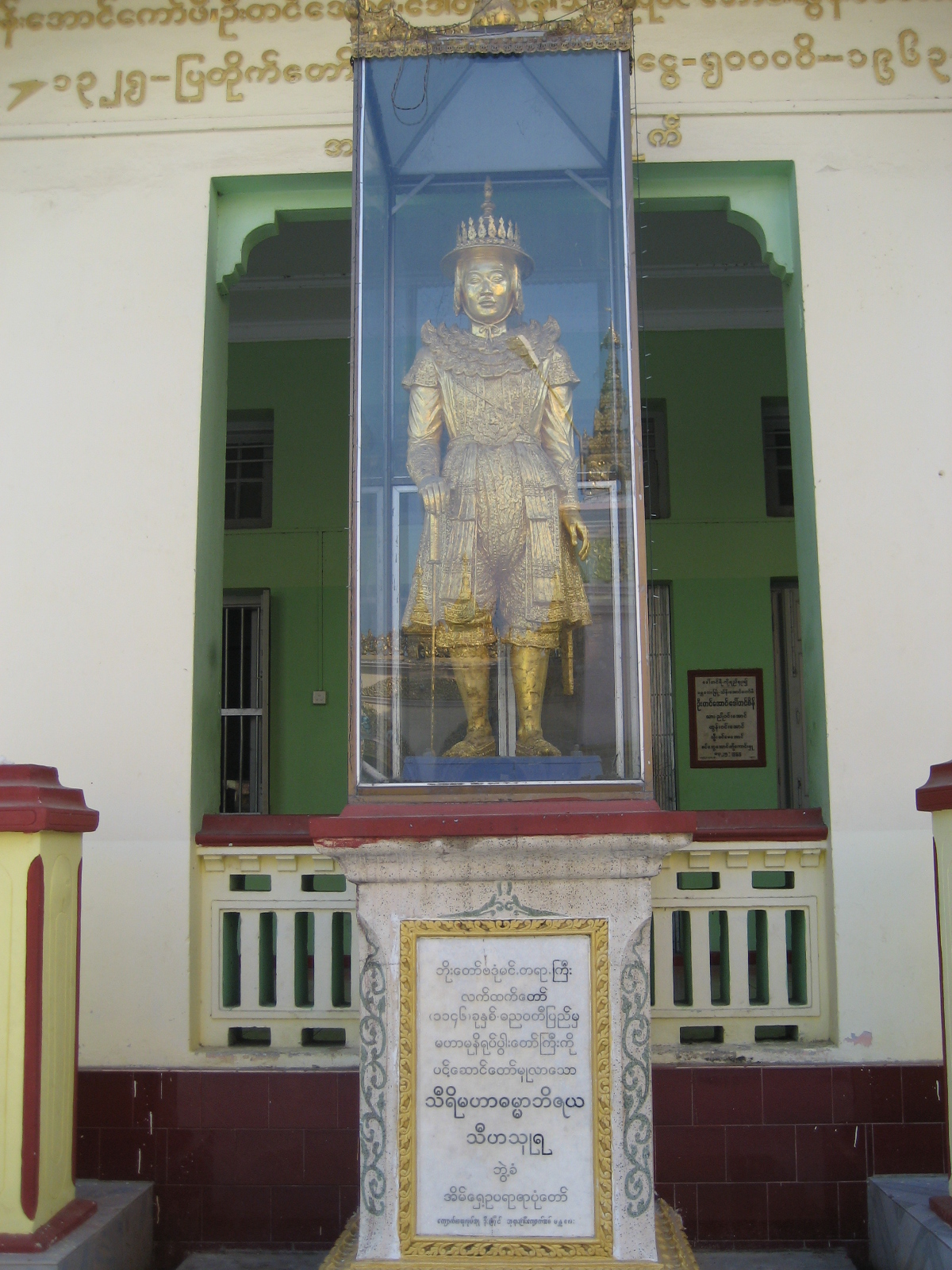
Statue of Crown Prince Thado Minsaw of Burma, son of King Bodawpaya, at Mahamuni Buddha Temple, Mandalay

Upon learning of defection of Nemyo Kyawdin to Siam, King Bodawpaya assigned his son and heir Prince Thado Minsaw the Uparaja to lead the campaigns to reclaim the Tenasserim Coast. Prince Thado Minsaw led the armies of 14,000 men together with his Sitkes Wunyi Maha Zeyathura and Nemyo Kyawdin Thihathu, leaving Amarapura in June 1792. He troops included the Manipuri horsemen. At Sagaing, the prince met Metkaya Bo who was the father of the defected governor Nemyo Kyawdin. Metkaya Bo was brutally executed at Sagaing.

Prince Thado Minsaw arrived at Rangoon in Lower Burma during the rainy season. Traditional wars were usually conducted in dry season as in rainy seasons the lands were marshy and unsuitable for the troops to march. Wunyi Maha Zeyathura and Nemyo Kyawdin Thihathu asked the prince to wait in Rangoon until the rainy season finished. However, the prince, fearing that the Siamese would use Tavoy as the base to invade Lower Burma, decided to continue the campaigns. Prince Thado Minsaw then organized the forces in the following manner;

- Atwin Wunyi Maha Zeyathura would lead the force of 5,000 men staying in Martaban.
- Einshe Wun Nemyo Kyawdin Thihathu would march to town of Ye with an army of 10,000 men to supervise the campaigns.

The prince also arranged for the navy forces to assault on the town of Tavoy;

- First Division: Anauk Wun Thiri Yaza Damarat with six big ships and 3,000 musketeers.
- Second Division: Nemyo Gonna Kyawthu with 10,000 men and 100 flotilla boats.
- Third Division: Mingyi Thinkaya with 10,000 men and 100 flotilla boats.
- Fourth Division: Balayanta Kyawdin with 10,000 men and 100 flotilla boats.

== Burmese Invasion of Tavoy (1793-94) ==
King Rama I and Prince Maha Sura Singhanat planned to initiate the campaigns in Lower Burma in November 1793. Chao Phraya Mahasena Pli and Chao Phraya Rattanaphiphit left Bangkok and reached Tavoy in December 1793 to join Phraya Yommaraj Bunnag. The three Siamese generals then received the news that the Burmese was coming for Tavoy and took defensive positions in the suburbs of Tavoy;

- Chao Phraya Mahasena Pli (Paya Kalahon in Burmese) with 10,000 men stationed at Kyaukmaw-kon to the east of the Tavoy.
- Chao Phraya Rattanaphiphit (Paya Ronpalat in Burmese) with 10,000 men at Kyetthandaing Pagoda to the northeast of Tavoy.
- Phraya Siharaj Decho with 5,000 men at Sankye-In to the north of Tavoy.
- Phraya Kanchanaburi and Phraya Ratchaburi with 10,000 men at Kyetsabyin to the south of Tavoy.
- Phraya Yommaraj Bunnag and Binnya Sein the Mon general with 15,000 inside the Tavoy town.

The Siamese, however, left most of the western side of Tavoy, bordering the Tavoy River, open. Prince Maha Sura Singhanat also sent a portion of his fleet to guard the entrance of Tavoy River.

=== Battle of Tavoy ===
The Second Division of Nemyo Gonna Kyawthu reached Tavoy first. With 10,000 men, Nemyo Gonna Kyawthu met the Siamese fleet at the mouth of Tavoy River and defeated it. Nemyo Gonna Kyawthu then sailed into Tavoy River and took lead to bring the Burmese fleets to the West bank of Tavoy River, opposite Tavoy. He anchored and disembarked his fleet at Hintha, southwest of Tavoy. The Third and Fourth Divisions under Mingyi Thinkaya and Balayanta Kyawdin, 10,000 men each, followed and landed at Kinmya to the northwest of Tavoy. The Land Forces of 10,000 men under Nemyo Kyawdin Thihathu also marched from Ye and arrived at Tavoy. Nemyo Kyawdin Thihathu took charge as the commander-in-chief.

The Burmese forces took their positions on the West bank of Tavoy River, opposite of the Tavoy town. Nemyo Kyawdin Thihathu sent a force to cross the river to gain a foothold on southeastern side of Tavoy but was opposed by Phraya Kanchanaburi, who was shot in battle. Binnya Sein built an earthen fort to the west of Tavoy and took position. However, Binnya Sein was routed by Burmese musketeers and Manipuri cavalry. The Burmese then built a bridge across the river and successfully crossed into Tavoy. The Burmese crossed the bridge and attacked Phraya Siharaj Decho at Sankye-In, who was defeated. The Burmese were able to establish themselves to the north of Tavoy. On the southern side, however, the Burmese were less successful as the Siamese at Kyetsabyin were able to repel Burmese attacks. The stalemate was reached as the Burmese secured western and northern suburbs of Tavoy, while the Siamese retained southern and eastern lands.

The Tavoyans, however, were dissatisfied with Siamese rule. In December 1793, seven Tavoyans contacted Nemyo Kyawdin Thihathu the commander to invite the Burmese to cooperatively storm the town. The Tavoyans would raise a flag and ignite a light as signs for the Burmese to attack. That night, however, the flag was raised but the light did not came as Yommaraj Bunnag found out the conspirators and had them executed. The Burmese did not proceed to attack and in the morning found the bodies of conspirators floating along the river. At this point, King Rama I was marching the main royal armies from Kanchanaburi towards Tavoy through Bongti Pass and Myitta, resting his troops at Heindar two days of travel from Tavoy. The Siamese in Tavoy were in dire conditions as prolonged siege depleted food and human resources. As most Tavoyan men were employed to fight on the city walls, the Siamese then assigned Tavoyan women to transport food supplies from the east. The Tavoyans, however, were convinced that the Siamese was going to abandon the city and forcibly deport the Tavoyan inhabitants back to Siam. They refused to obey Siamese orders. Chao Phraya Mahasena Pli then had Wundauk, the leader of resistance, whipped as punishment.

A Tavoyan named Nga Zeya swam across Tavoy River to visit Nemyo Kyawdin Thihathu. Upon learning of Tavoyan dissatisfactions towards the Siamese, Nemyo Kyawdin Thihathu ordered that all Burmese forces should enter the Tavoy town in that night. On 16 January 1794, the Burmese staged all-out attacks against Tavoy and the Tavoyans opened the gates for the Burmese. The Siamese authorities in Tavoy collapsed and Siamese personnel including Yommaraj Bunnag escaped to the east. After taking Tavoy, Burmese and Tavoyan forces stormed the Siamese regiments at eastern suburbs, all of which were defeated and retreated. The three Siamese generals; Mahasena Pli, Rattanaphiphit and Yommaraj Bunnag led the Siamese retreat to Hindaad where King Rama I had been staying but was closely followed by Burmese armies.

The Siamese suffered heavy losses. The three Siamese generals reached the camps of Phraya Aphai Ronnarit who was commanding the royal vanguard of King Rama I. The three generals asked Aphai Ronnarit to take refuge in his camps but Aphai Ronnarit refused, saying that his task was to secure the royal frontline and if he failed the royal army would be in danger. The three generals and the rest of retreating Siamese then fought the outnumbering Burmese in front of the camps of Aphai Ronnarit. Yommaraj Bunnag and Rattanaphiphit managed to escape but Mahasena Pli was killed in battle. His head was taken as trophy by the Burmese. King Rama I, upon learning of Siamese defeat at Tavoy, ordered the general retreat.

The Siamese king and his generals retreated towards Myitta, passing through the Bongti Pass to Kanchanaburi on the Khwae Noi River. King Rama I angered that the inappropriate actions of Aphai Ronnarit had caused the death of Chao Phraya Mahasena Pli, who was the Samuha Kalahom or the Prime Minister of Southern Siam. Aphai Ronnarit was executed at Kanchanaburi.

=== Battle of Mergui ===
Prince Maha Sura Singhanat supervised the construction of Siamese fleet at Theinkun. After the construction was finished, the prince moved to Kraburi and commanded his generals Phraya Chasaenyakorn Thurian and Phraya Kraikosa to lead the Siamese fleet from Tanintharyi out of the Tanintharyi river to join the land forces at Tavoy to invade Burma. Unbeknownst to them, however by that time the Siamese were already defeated at Tavoy. When the news of Siamese defeat at Tavoy had reached Mergui, Setya-u-chi the governor of Mergui decided to defect back to the Burmese side.

When Phraya Chasaenyakorn Thurian and Phraya Kraikosa sailed the Siamese fleet along the Tanintharyi River, reaching Mergui at its mouth, they learned that Mergui had defected back to the Burmese. Instead of going on, Chasaenyakorn Thurian decided to attack the port city of Mergui. He used the Siamese canons on the ships to bombard Mergui intensely but the city did not fall. Chasaenyakorn Thurian intensified the attacks by disembarking at Pahtaw Pahtet, an island immediately in front of the city, to shell the city in closer range. He inflicted the cannonballs on the city of Mergui so intensely that the Burmese defensive forces had to dig holes for shelter. After bombardments, however, the city of Mergui persisted.

Prince Maha Sura Singhanat at Kraburi received the news that the Siamese had been defeated at Tavoy and the king had ordered the general retreat. So, the prince recalled the fleet. Just when Chasaenyakorn Thurian was embarking for the retreat, the Burmese forces led by Nemyo Kyawdin Thihathu and the fleet led by Thiri Yaza Damarat arrived at Mergui from Tavoy. The Burmese forces poured onto the retreating Siamese and Chasaenyakorn Thurian had to retreat hastily towards Kraburi. The Siamese sailed the fleet back and disembarked at Ranong, where the met the Burmese again. Chasaenyakorn Thurian decided to abandon Siamese ships and retreated by land. Despite being closely followed by the Burmese, Chasaenyakorn Thurian managed to hold out Burmese attacks and allowed his forces to retreat safely back to Chumphon.

== Conclusion ==
Prince Thadow Minsaw stayed at Rangoon as the supreme commander all through the campaigns. When the Siamese were mostly expelled from the Tenassarim Coast by January 1794, the prince appointed the new governor of Tavoy and returned to Amarapura.

At the death of Chao Phraya Mahasena Pli, King Rama I appointed Phraya Yommaraj Bunnag to the post of Samuha Kalahom or Prime Minister of Southern Siam, becoming Chao Phraya Akka Mahasena Bunnag.

Nemyo Kyawdin, the former governor of Tavoy, continued to stay in Bangkok and became the head of Tavoyan community in Bangkok. About twenty years later in 1816, the Burmese war prisoners in Bangkok broke the prison and rebelled. Nemyo Kyawdin was implicated in the plot and was executed on that occasion.

Konbaung control of Tenasserim would last for nearly 70 years. In the 1820s, during the First Anglo-Burmese War, King Rama III sent another military expedition to the Tenasserim Coast, capturing Mergui and forcibly relocating its inhabitants. However, this caused a diplomatic incident with the British, which resulted in Rama III withdrawing his Siamese expedition from Mergui.

In the aftermath of the war, the Burmese-controlled portion of the Tenasserim Coast was seceded to Britain, which it would control until 1948, when it was transferred to a newly independent Myanmar.
