= Than Oo =

- သန်းဦး

Director-General of the Department of Basic Education
- Incumbent
- Assumed office 1977

Assistant Education Research Officer of the Burma Education Research Bureau
- In office 1965–1977

Personal details
- Born: 1928 Chaungnadan village, Pyay Township, Pegu Province, British Burma
- Died: 23 June 2024 (aged 96)
- Education: Rangoon University
- Occupation: Educator
- Nickname: ကိုဟုတ်ကဲ့

Than Oo (Burmese: သန်းဦး, 1928–2024) was a prominent Burmese educator and Ministry of Education (MOE) official.

He was born in Chaungnadan village in Pyay Township, Pegu Province (now Bago Region), located 170 miles (270 km) north of Rangoon (now Yangon) in 1928. His mother was mentally ill, while his father and elder brother died when Than Oo was young. Than Oo studied at Rangoon University, obtaining a Bachelor of Arts in education. He continued his study at the University of Hawaiʻi, through a scholarship with the East-West Center, and obtained a Master of Education in 1963.

Than Oo subsequently returned to Burma. He was appointed Assistant Administration Officer of Schools at the Directorate of Education, and went on to become a Principal of the Bassein Teacher Training School. In 1965, he was appointed the Assistant Education Research Officer under the Ministry of Education's Burma Education Research Bureau. There, he began a nationwide mass literacy movement that increased Burma's literacy rate to 78.6% by 1988, and reformed the Burmese language pedagogy.

In 1977, he was appointed to Director-General of the MOE's Department of Basic Education, becoming an influential education advisor.

== Later projects ==
Than Oo was the chairman of the Myanmar Academy of Arts and Science. He also served on the academic advisory board of the Myanmar Education Promotion Implementation Committee. He also served as the chairman for the Myanmar Literacy Resource Centre.

== Honorary recognition ==
In 2013, the University of Yangon awarded Than Oo an Honorary Doctorate of Letters for his professional accomplishments. On 16 May 2015, the University of Hawaiʻi awarded him an Honorary Doctorate of Humane Letters.
