= Myo Zaw Thein =

Burmese army officer

- မျိုးဇော်သိမ်း

Adjutant General of Myanmar Armed Forces
- In office July 2019 – October 2022
- Leader: Min Aung Hlaing

Personal details
- Born: January 4, 1966 (age 60) Paukkaung Township, Bago Region, Burma (now Myanmar)
- Party: Union Solidarity and Development Party
- Education: Defence Services Academy

Military service
- Allegiance: Myanmar
- Branch/service: Myanmar Army
- Years of service: 1987–2022
- Rank: Lieutenant General

Lieutenant General Myo Zaw Thein (Burmese: မျိုးဇော်သိမ်း) is a former Burmese military officer and vice-chair of the Union Solidarity and Development Party, the Burmese military's proxy political party.

== Military career ==
Myo Zaw Thein graduated from the 28th batch of the Defence Services Academy. He was appointed to become the military's adjutant general in July 2019, and previously served as the commander for the Yangon Command and the Bureau of Special Operations No. 5. In October 2022, he retired from the Burmese armed forces to succeed Khin Yi as vice-chair in the military's proxy political party, the Union Solidarity and Development Party.

== See also ==
- 2021–2023 Myanmar civil war
- State Administration Council
- Tatmadaw
