= Chaophraya Mahasena (Pli) =

Prime Minister of Southern Siam

Chao Phraya Mahasena Pli
- เจ้าพระยามหาเสนา (ปลี)

Samuha Kalahom (Prime Minister of Southern Siam)
- In office 1782–1794
- Monarch: Rama I
- Preceded by: Phraya Mahasena
- Succeeded by: Chaophraya Akkha Mahasena Bunnag

Personal details
- Died: January 1794 Tavoy, Burma
- Parent: Chaophraya Kalahom Khlongklaeb (father)

Chaophraya Mahasena (Thai: เจ้าพระยามหาเสนา, died January 1794), personal name Pli (Thai: ปลี), was the Samuha Kalahom (Thai: สมุหกลาโหม) or Prime Minister of Southern Siam from 1782 to 1794. He was known for his roles in many military campaigns for Siam (modern Thailand) in the late eighteenth century.

Chaophraya Mahasena Pli was a son of Chaophraya Kalahom Khlongklaeb (Thai: เจ้าพระยากลาโหมคลองแกลบ), who was the Samuha Kalahom or Minister of Military from 1755 to 1759 during the reign of King Borommokot of Ayutthaya. He appeared in history for the first time in Thonburi period when he was Phra Phonlamueang, an official position under Chaophraya Surasi the governor of Phitsanulok. Pli was later promoted to the position of Phraya Phetchabun the governor of Phetchabun. In 1778, during the Siamese Invasion of Laos, King Surinyavong of Luang Phrabang pledged alliance to the Siamese and contributed a force of 3,000 Lao men to join the Siamese attacks on Vientiane. Chaophraya Chakri ordered Phraya Phetchabun Pli to lead the Lao forces from Luang Phrabang to attack the city of Vientiane from the northeast.

When Chaophraya Chakri became King Rama I and established the Rattanakosin Kingdom in 1782, he appointed Phraya Phetchabun Pli as Samuha Kalahom with the title of Chaophraya Mahasena. Since 1733, due to a political conflict, the position of Samuha Kalahom had been deprived of its authority over Southern Siam and had become a powerless military figurehead. In 1782, with the appointment of Chaophraya Mahasena Pli, King Rama I restored the authority over Southern Siamese cities to Samuha Kalahom, which became the position of Prime Minister of Southern Siam. Historical records described that Pli was appointed to this position of Samuha Kalahom because his long meritorious service under Chaophraya Surasi or Prince Surasinghanat of the Front Palace and because Pli's father had been a Samuha Kalahom previously.

== Nine Armies' War ==
During the Nine Armies' War in 1785, King Rama I assigned Prince Anurak Devesh and Chaophraya Mahasena Pli to lead the Siamese armies of 15,000 men to face the invading Burmese to the north. Thado Thiri Maha Uzana, the Burmese commander who was besieging Lampang, sent his Sitke general Nemyo Sithu to bring 3,000 Burmese men to the south into Upper Chao Phraya Plains. Nemyo Sithu stationed at Pakphing to the south of Phitsanulok. Prince Anurak Devesh marched from Bangkok to Nakhon Sawan and sent Mahasena Pli as vanguard to Phichit, just to the south of Pakphing. However, both sides stood unmoved and did not engage. In March 1786, King Rama I himself marched north to Phichit and urged his nephew Anurak Devesh to engage with the Burmese. Anurak Devesh and Mahasena Pli from Phichit finally engaged with the Burmese at Pakphing, leading to the Battle of Pakphing. The Siamese were victorious and the Burmese were repelled to the north. King Rama I then ordered Mahasena Pli and Prince Chakchetsada to bring the Siamese armies to the north to relieve the siege of Lampang. Mahasena Pli was able to repel the Burmese from Lampang.

== Expeditions to Tavoy ==
In January 1788, King Rama I went on offensives on the Tenasserim Coast against Burma. King Rama I sent Chaophraya Mahasena Pli and Chaophraya Rattanaphiphit (who was the Samuha Nayok) as vanguard to cross an arduous mountain pass to invade Tavoy. The two Siamese ministers faced the Burmese commander Natmilin in the Battle of Kaleinaung in March 1788. The Siamese prevailed and proceed to lay siege on Tavoy. Burmese defenders in Tavoy stood still and the Siamese did not engage due to unfavorable conditions. King Rama I finally decided to order the retreat of Siamese armies from Tavoy and ended the campaign.

Later in 1792, Nemyo Kyawdin or Myinzaingza, the Burmese governor of Tavoy, decided to defect to Siam due to his conflicts with King Bodawpaya. Siam then came to temporarily occupy the Tenasserim Coast. King Rama I sent Mahasena Pli and Rattaphiphit the two ministers to join forces with Phraya Yommaraj Bunnag (the primogenitor of the Bunnag family) at Tavoy and proceed to invade Lower Burma. However, Bodawpaya sent his son the Upayaza Crown Prince Thado Minsaw to lead the Burmese armies to reclaim Tavoy and repel the Siamese from the Tenasserim coast. In 1793, Chaophraya Mahasena Pli wrote to Francis Light, a British merchant in Penang, to request the purchase of Western muskets to be employed against the Burmese. The Siamese armies reached Tavoy in December 1793 and took defensive positions on the eastern suburbs of the Tavoy town. Prince Thado Minsaw sent Einshe Wun Nemyo Kyawdin Thihathu to attack the Siam-held Tavoy, leading to the Battle of Tavoy. The Burmese took control of western outskirts and attacked the Siamese heavily on the eastern side.

The Tavoyans, the inhabitants of Tavoy, were dissatisfied with Siamese rule and began their uprisings. Mahasena Pli (known as Paya Kalahon in the Burmese Hmannan chronicles) punished a Tavoyan named Wundauk for his leadership in resistance against Siam. When King Rama I and his main royal armies were approaching Tavoy, the Tavoyans opened the city gates for the Burmese to enter. The Siamese were then defeated in January 1794. The three Siamese minister-commanders: Mahasena Pli, Rattanaphiphit and Bunnag, retreated towards the king's armies and asked to take refuge in the camps of Phraya Aphai Ronnarit who was responsible for the king's vanguard. Aphai Ronnarit, however, refused to let the three generals and other retreating Siamese into his encampments, citing that his duty was to secure the royal vanguard and the Burmese might follow them into his camps. The outnumbered retreating Siamese then had to fight the pursuing Burmese in front of Aphai Ronnarit's camp. Rattanaphiphit and Bunnag survived but Mahasena Pli was killed in battle. His head was taken as a trophy by the Burmese. The Siamese were unable to retrieve his body and declared him disappeared. The Burmese then broke into Aphai Ronnarit's camp and defeated him. King Rama I, upon learning of Siamese defeat at Tavoy, decided to retreat his armies back to Kanchanaburi.

King Rama I was angered that inappropriate actions of Phraya Aphai Ronnarit led to the loss of Chaophraya Mahasena Pli the Samuha Kalahom, who had been a prominent military commander. The king then had Aphai Ronnarit executed in Kanchanaburi in 1794. Phraya Yommaraj Bunnag was made to succeed Mahasena Pli as Chaophraya Akkha Mahasena the Samuha Kalahom.
