= Pyay =

Pyay ပြည်မြို့ (Burmese) ဍုၚ်ပြန် (Mon) Prome
- City
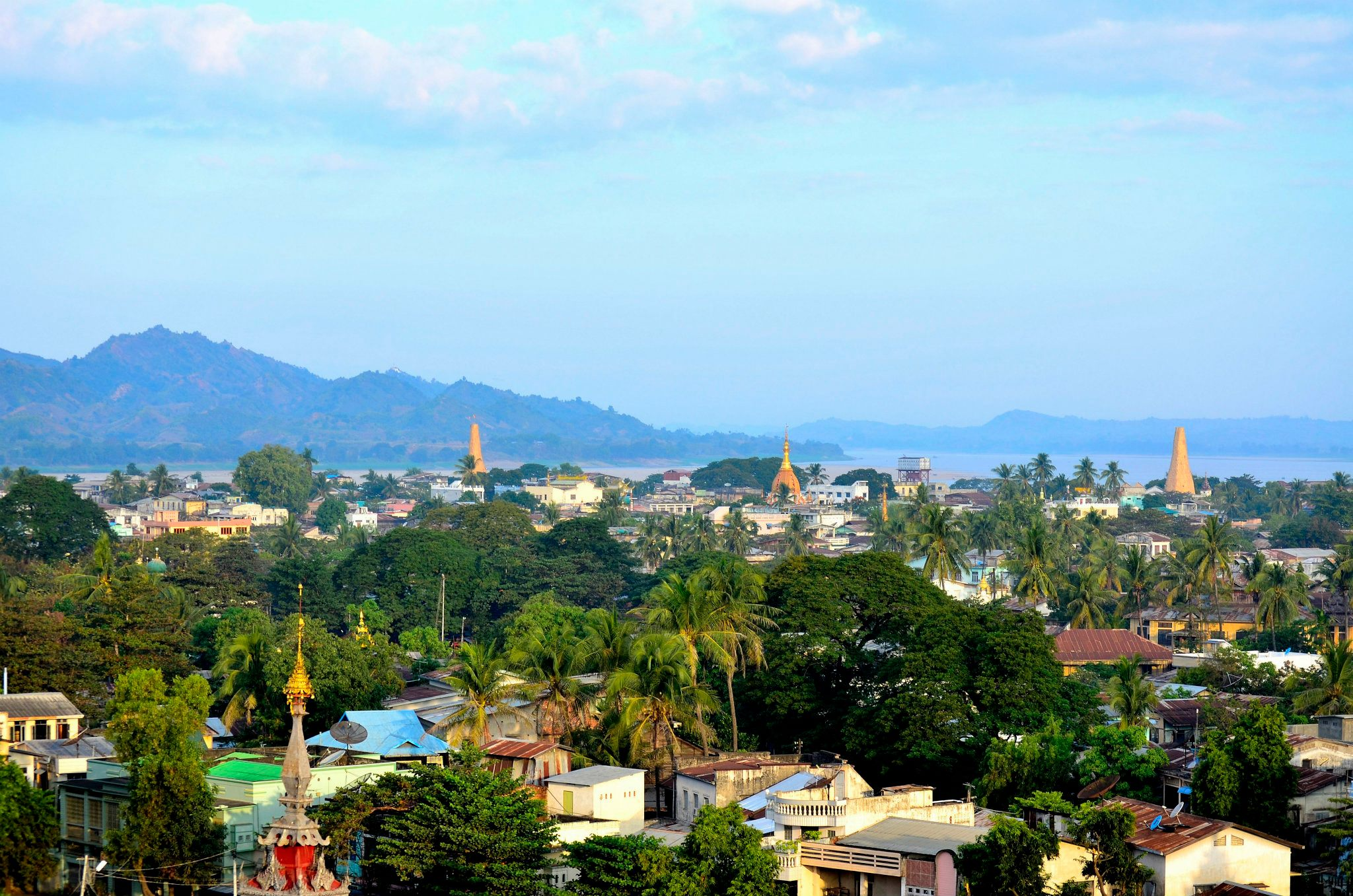
- The view of Pyay and Irrawaddy River from Shwesandaw Pagoda

- Location within Myanmar
- Country: Myanmar
- Division: Bago Region
- District: Pyay District
- Township: Pyay Township

Area
  - City: 34.48 km^{2} (13.31 sq mi)

Population (2014)
  - Urban: 134,861
  - Metro: 251,643
- Time zone: UTC+6:30 (+6:30)

Pyay, (Note: English: /pjeɪ/; Burmese: ပြည်မြို့, MLCTS: prany mrui., pronounced [pjì mjo̰]) and formerly anglicised as Prome, (Note: From Mon ပြန် Pron [prɔ̤ːn]) is the principal town of Pyay Township in the Bago Region in Myanmar. Pyay is located on the bank of the Irrawaddy River, 260 km (160 mi) north-west of Yangon. It is an important trade center for the Ayeyarwady Delta, Central and Upper Myanmar and the Rakhine (Arakan) State. The British Irrawaddy Flotilla Company established the current town in the late 19th century on the Irrawaddy as a transshipment point for cargo between Upper and Lower Burma. Pyay is also the terminus of Yangon-Pyay Railway which was the first railway line in Burma (Myanmar), opening on 1 May 1877. The English novelist Jane Austen's brother Rear Admiral Charles Austen died here in 1852. Shin Raṭṭhasāra, a Buddhist monk and prominent classical poet during the Kingdom of Ava also died here in 1529 and a mausoleum was constructed to honor him.

The district of Pyay encompasses the valley of the Irrawaddy, located between Thayet, Hinthada and Tharrawaddy districts. Along the western side of Pyay District are the Arakan Mountains and along the eastern side are the Pegu Range. Pyay District's main towns are Pyay, Shwedaung, and Paungde.

== Etymology ==
The name "Pyay" means "Country" in Burmese, and refers to the ruins of the main city of the Pyu city-states, Sri Ksetra (Burmese: သရေခေတ္တရာ, Sanskrit Śrīkṣetra "blessed place, country"), which is located 8 km (5.0 mi) to the south-east of modern Pyay and is in the village of Hmawza.

== Geography ==
The north and north-east of the district is forest-covered, and contains numerous valleys and ravines, which unite in one large stream called the Nawin. The most important of the plains lie in the south and south-west portions of Pyay, and extend along the whole length of the railway that runs between. In addition there are large tracts of land covered by jungle, which are available for cultivation. The principal river is the Irrawaddy River, which intersects the district from north to south; next in importance are the Thani and its tributaries and the Nawin system of rivers. In the hills near the capital the soil is of Tertiary formation, and in the plains it is an alluvial deposit.

Historical Context: Historically, Pyay encompassed an area of approximately 18 square miles (47 square km) within its walled city. This made it one of the largest walled cities in Southeast Asia during its peak. Present Day: The total area of Pyay City is now 34.48 square kilometers. The urban area has expanded rapidly since 1990, growing from 21.76 square kilometers to 34.48 square kilometers in 2018. This urban expansion has been concentrated in the eastern and southern parts of the city. Location and Importance: Pyay is located on the eastern bank of the Ayeyarwady River, 260 kilometers northwest of Yangon. It serves as an important trade center for the Ayeyarwady Delta, Central and Upper Myanmar, and the Rakhine (Arakan) State.

== History ==
Mucate surrounds the construction of Sri Ksetra. Htin Aung suggests that Pyu might have been founded in 78 CE, based on the Sanskrit / Pyu Era. D. G. E. Hall and Gordon Luce, however, claim that civilisation of the Irrawaddy Valley could not have been possible before the 4th century, thus, attributing the founding of Sri Ksetra to 638, from which the current Burmese Kawza Era begins.

Sri Ksetra was the capital of the Pyu dynasty of Vikrama. The city was circular with walls enclosing about 46 km^{2} (18 sq mi), making it the largest walled city in Southeast Asia during its peak. The city contained both housing and farms, as is evident from the remains of waterways and tanks which have been discovered.

The Chinese pilgrims Xuanzang and Yijing mentioned Sri Ksetra in their mid-7th-century accounts. It is not known when precisely the Pyu abandoned Sri Ksetra and moved northward. It is speculated that their decline was due to the growth of the Irrawaddy river delta, cutting it off from coastal trade, and also from Mon and later Tai Shan incursions. Burmese chronicles state that when Anawrahta invaded the southern parts of modern-day Myanmar in 1057, he ordered the ruins of Sri Ksetra to be destroyed to prevent rebels from sheltering there. The Burmese came to call the old Pyu center Pyi. The extensive ruins have been the subject of intensive archaeological investigation.

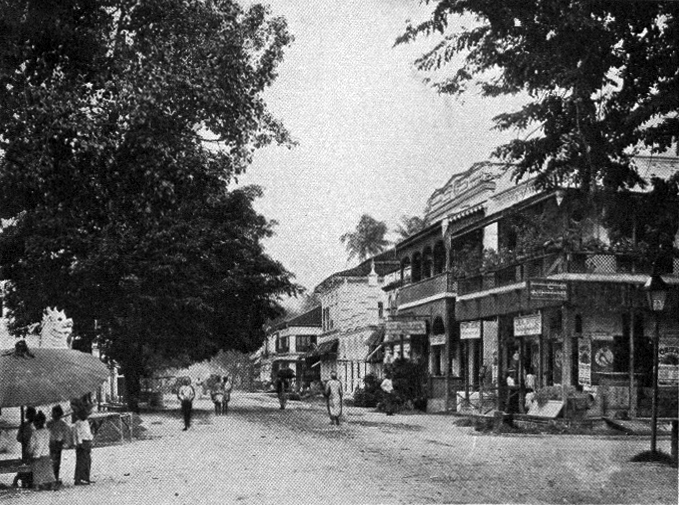
Strand Road in 1910.

Called Prome by the British (after the name that appears in the Portuguese texts of the 17th century), the city became part of British territory after the Second Anglo-Burmese War in 1853. The town was taken by the British in 1825 during the Battle of Prome and again in 1852, on both occasions with hardly any opposition. In 1862, it was almost entirely destroyed by fire, and was afterwards relaid out in straight and broad streets. It was erected into a municipality in 1874, and since then great improvements have been made, including waterworks.

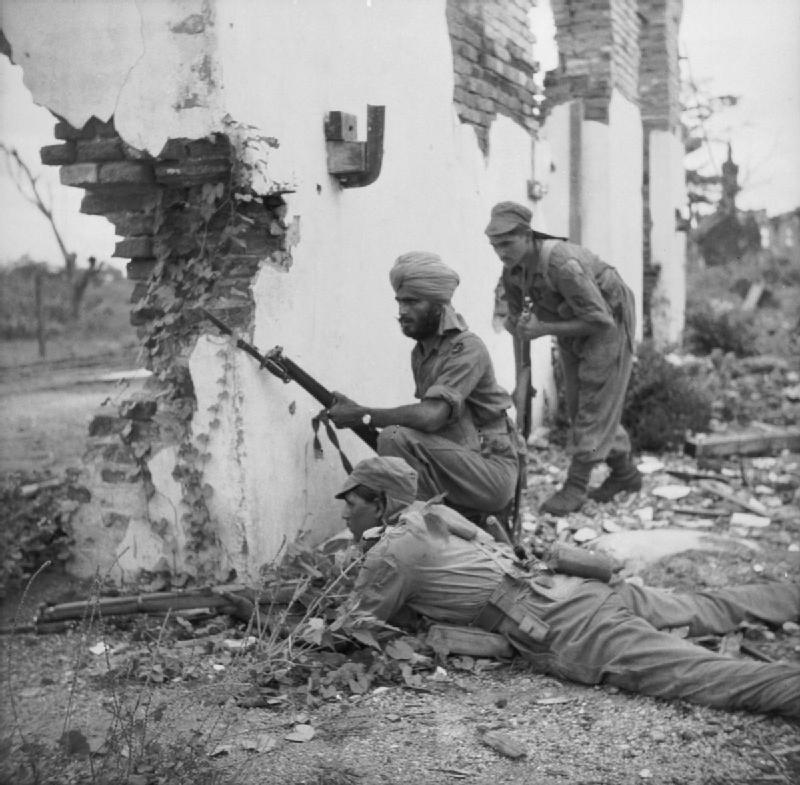
Indian troops of the 20th Division search for Japanese at the badly damaged station in Prome, 3 May 1945.

During World War II the city was the site of the Battle of Prome. The city was later retaken by the British Army in May 1945.

== Climate ==
Pyay has a tropical savanna climate (Köppen climate classification Aw). Temperatures are hot throughout the year, especially in the months before the monsoon from March to May when average maximum temperatures exceed 36 °C or 96.8 °F. The winter months from December to February are somewhat milder than the rest of the year. There is a winter dry season from December to April and a summer wet season from May to November, although rainfall during this wet season is much less extreme than in coastal cities like Yangon or especially Sittwe.

Climate data for Pyay (1991–2020)
Month	Jan	Feb	Mar	Apr	May	Jun	Jul	Aug	Sep	Oct	Nov	Dec	Year
Mean daily maximum °C (°F)	32.6 (90.7)	35.5 (95.9)	37.9 (100.2)	38.9 (102.0)	36.1 (97.0)	32.3 (90.1)	31.3 (88.3)	31.4 (88.5)	32.7 (90.9)	33.6 (92.5)	33.3 (91.9)	31.9 (89.4)	33.9 (93.0)
Daily mean °C (°F)	24.4 (75.9)	26.6 (79.9)	29.5 (85.1)	31.8 (89.2)	30.8 (87.4)	28.5 (83.3)	27.9 (82.2)	27.9 (82.2)	28.5 (83.3)	28.8 (83.8)	27.5 (81.5)	25.1 (77.2)	28.1 (82.6)
Mean daily minimum °C (°F)	16.3 (61.3)	17.7 (63.9)	21.2 (70.2)	24.6 (76.3)	25.5 (77.9)	24.7 (76.5)	24.5 (76.1)	24.5 (76.1)	24.4 (75.9)	24.1 (75.4)	21.7 (71.1)	18.2 (64.8)	22.3 (72.1)
Average precipitation mm (inches)	4.3 (0.17)	0.7 (0.03)	4.9 (0.19)	36.5 (1.44)	145.9 (5.74)	260 (10.2)	218.5 (8.60)	232.8 (9.17)	219.1 (8.63)	130.8 (5.15)	30.2 (1.19)	4.1 (0.16)	1,287.8 (50.70)
Average precipitation days (≥ 1.0 mm)	0.4	0.1	0.7	2.1	9.6	18.9	19.8	19.7	15.8	10.1	2.7	0.4	100.3
Source: World Meteorological Organization

== Economy ==
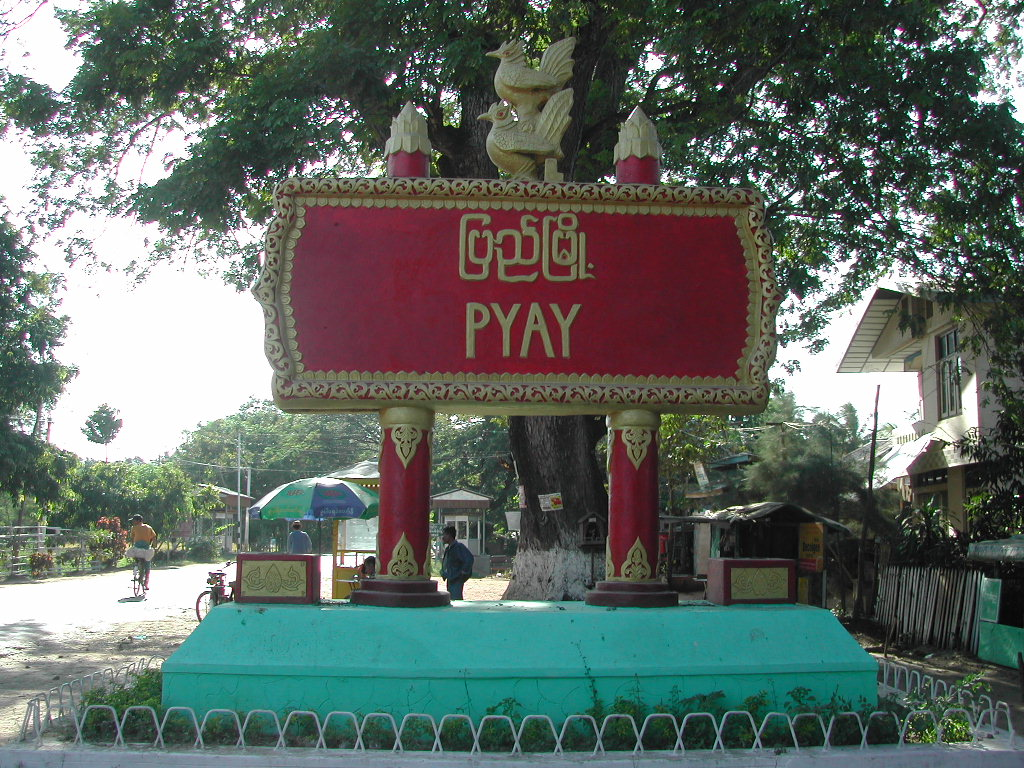
Sign indicating city limits of Pyay

The main crop is rice, but some cotton and tobacco are grown, while the custard apples are famous. Sericulture is extensively carried on by a special class. The forests yield teak and cutch, cotton and silk-weaving are important industries; there are also manufactures of ornamental boxes, coarse brown sugar and cutch.

== Culture ==
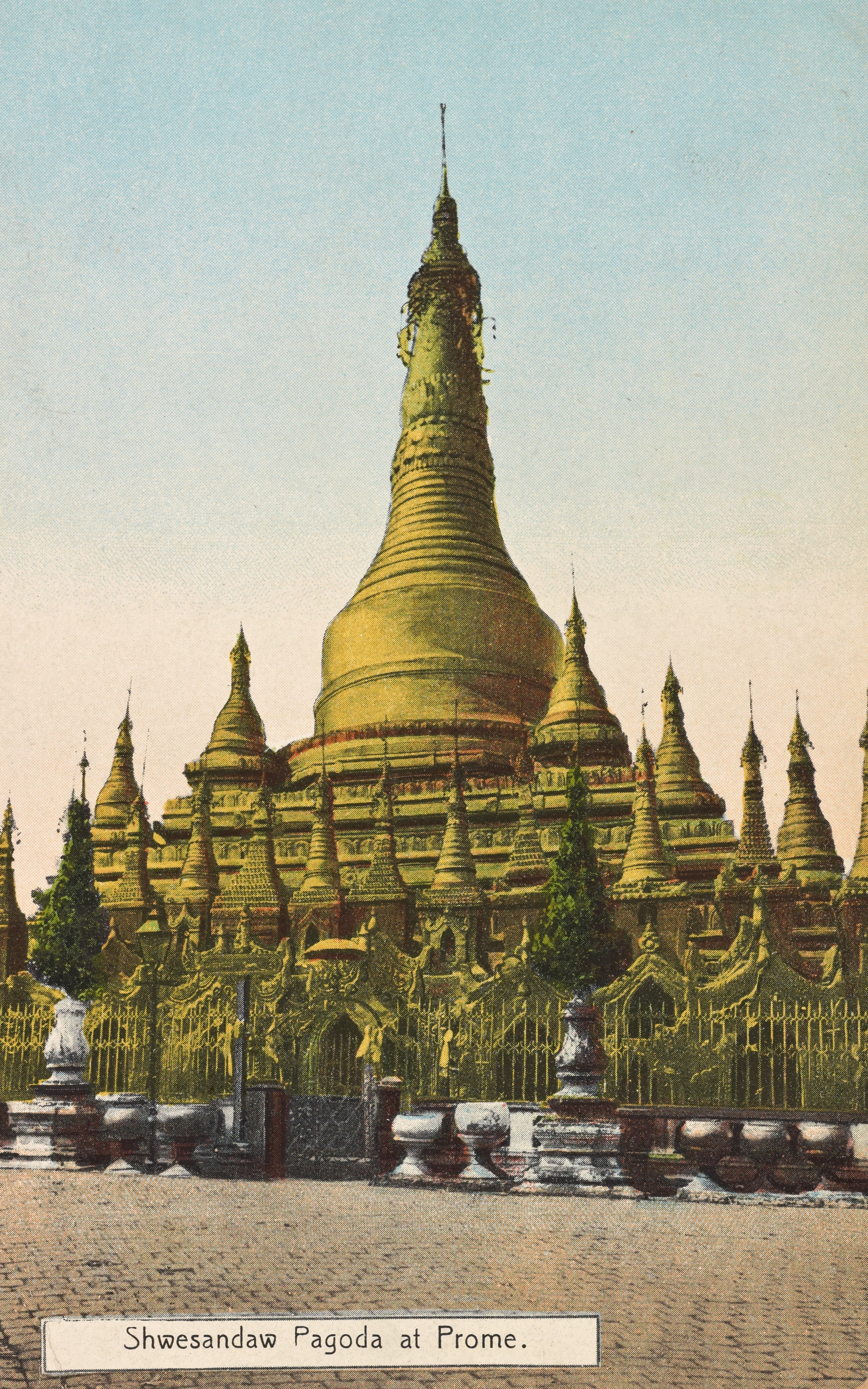
A post card of Shwesandaw Pagoda in Pyay dating to 1910.

For a town of its size, Pyay is well-renowned for a number of local delicacies. It is reputed for the Pyay palata (ပြည်ပလာတာ), consisting of paratha, Burmese chicken and potato curry, and raw onions. It is also known for a number of Burmese salads, including the Pyay rice salad (ပြည်ထမင်းသုပ်) and Pyay assorted salad (ပြည်အသုပ်စုံ).

Pyay also produces a local pickled delicacy called taw laphet (တောလက်ဖက်; lit. 'rural laphet') or Nibbinda laphet (နိဗ္ဗိန္ဒလက်ဖက်). Originating from Burmese nunneries in the hills surrounding Pyay, the laphet is fermented from the leaves of the naywe (နရွဲ) tree, or kyettet (ကြက်တက်), the Combretum pilosum plant. The pulp is then tightly wrapped into dried banbwe (ဘန့်ပွေး) leaves and left soaking in regularly changed water for up to 2 years, before it is consumed. Taw laphet is otherwise consumed in an identical fashion to traditional laphet.

== Tourism ==
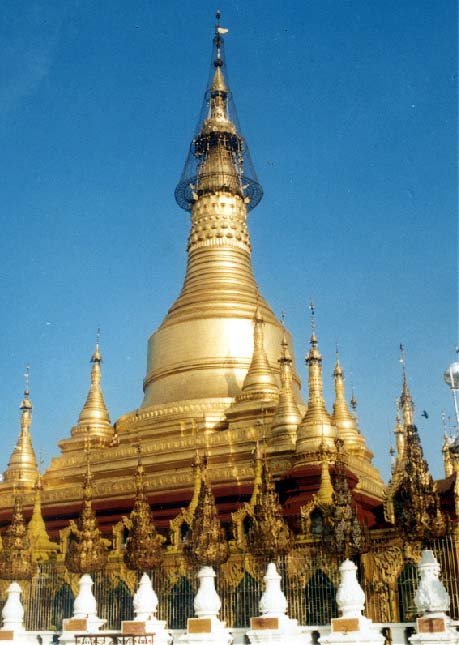
Shwesandaw Pagoda is located in the center of Pyay.

To the south and south-east, the town is closed in by low pagoda-topped hills, on one of which stands the conspicuous gilded Shwesandaw Pagoda. The Shwesandaw Pagoda is a notable Buddhist pagoda in the center of Pyay.

To the west of Pyay, crossing Irrawaddy river through Nawaday bridge, stands the Shwebontha Muni Pagoda. The Buddha statue is one of three replica of the Maha Myat Muni Buddha statue, believed to date back 554 B.C. when the king Sandar Thuriya ruled.

To the southeast of pyay, about 7 miles from city the Unesco World Heritage acient Pyu City Srikestra is situated.

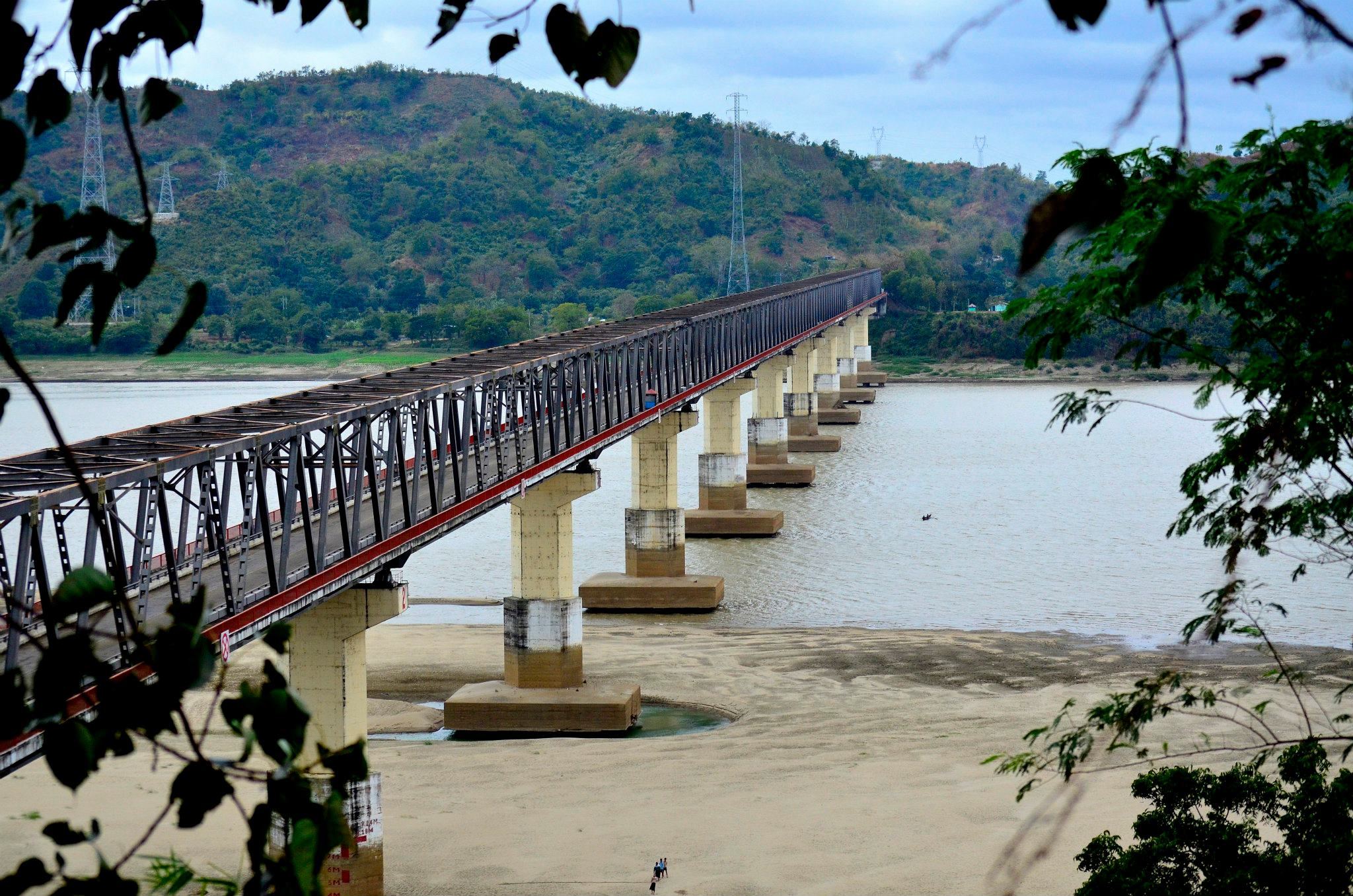
View of Nawaday Bridge from Mingyi Hill in January 2012

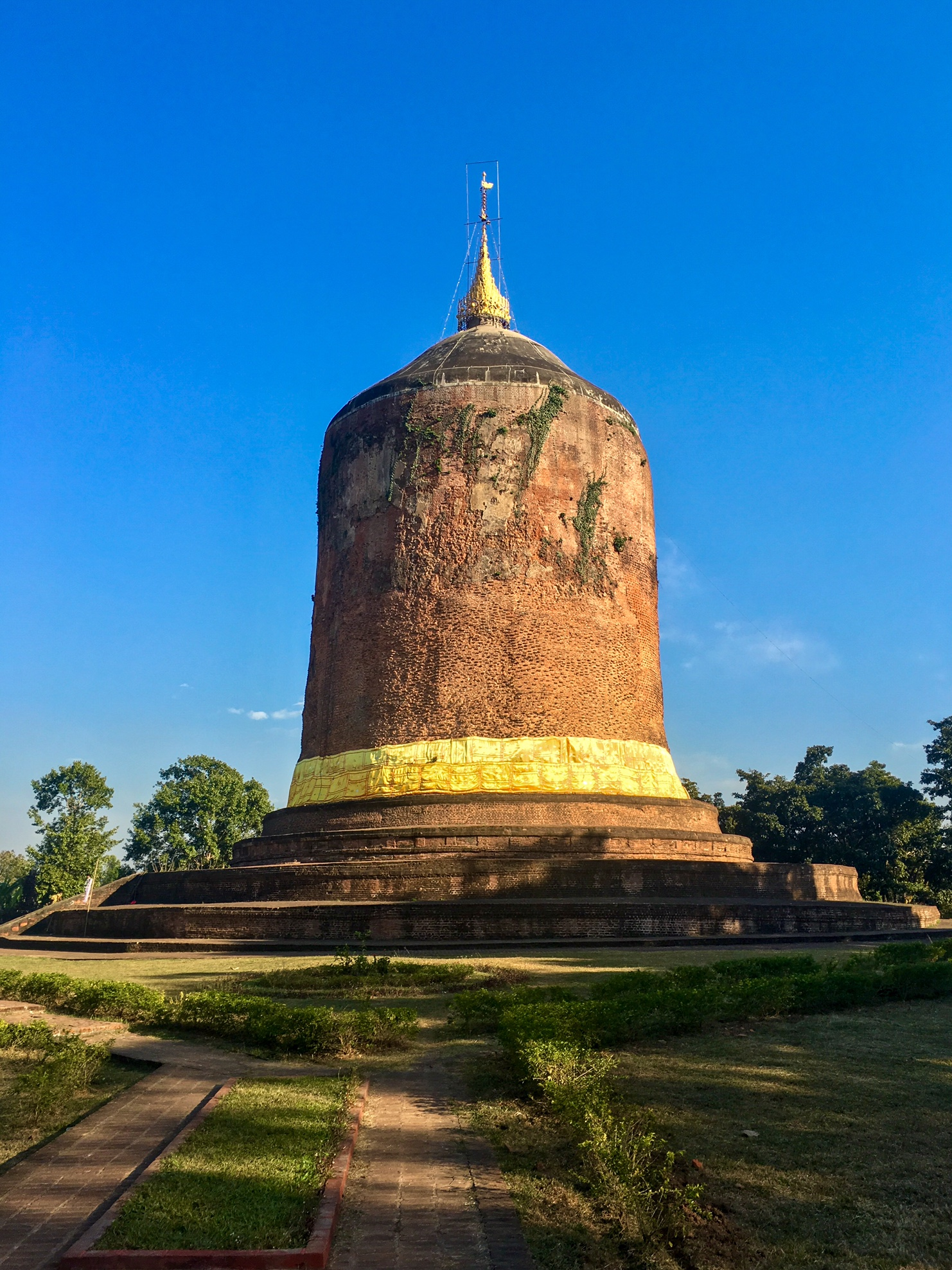
Bawbawgyi Stupa in Sri Ksetra Pyu Ancient City

== Education ==
Pyay City has three universities and one degree college. The universities are Pyay University (PU), Pyay Technological University (PTU), and Computer University, Pyay. Pyay University is situated near to the town centre of Pyay. PTU, which is one of the highest-ranked universities in Myanmar, is situated between Hnawgone and Latkhoukpin village, a few miles away from Pyay. CU, Pyay is situated near the new town. Pyay Education Degree College is located on Pyay-Magway Road near Titut Village.

== Healthcare ==
- Pyay 500-bed General Hospital
- Pyay Traditional Medicine Hospital
- Aung Zaw Oo - 1 Private Hospital
- Aung Zaw Oo - 2 Private Hospital
- Myo Thuka Private Hospital
- Aung Tharaphu Private Hospital
- Lawkaparla Private Hospital
- Pyi Myanmar Private Hospital
- Paramishin Private Hospital
- Thanlwin Private Hospital

== Notable people ==
- U Nyi Pu (1900-1996), a Burmese actor and film director, the very first film actor in Burmese cinema
- A1 Tin Maung (1908-2000), a two-time Burmese Academy Award-winning film actor, director and producer, the youngest brother of U Nyi Pu
- General Thura Kyaw Htin (1925-1996), Commander-in-Chief of the Armed Forces of the Union of Burma, former Deputy Prime Minister of Burma and Minister of Defence
- Khin One (1947-2000), Burmese painter, writer and singer
- Thukhamein Hlaing (1948), Burmese poet, songwriter and writer

== Notes ==
Pyay
Preceded by	Capital of Prome Kingdom c. November 1482 – 19 May 1542	Kingdom defeated by Toungoo forces
