= Tavoy campaign (1788) =

Military conflict

Burmese–Siamese War (1788)
- Part of the Burmese–Siamese wars
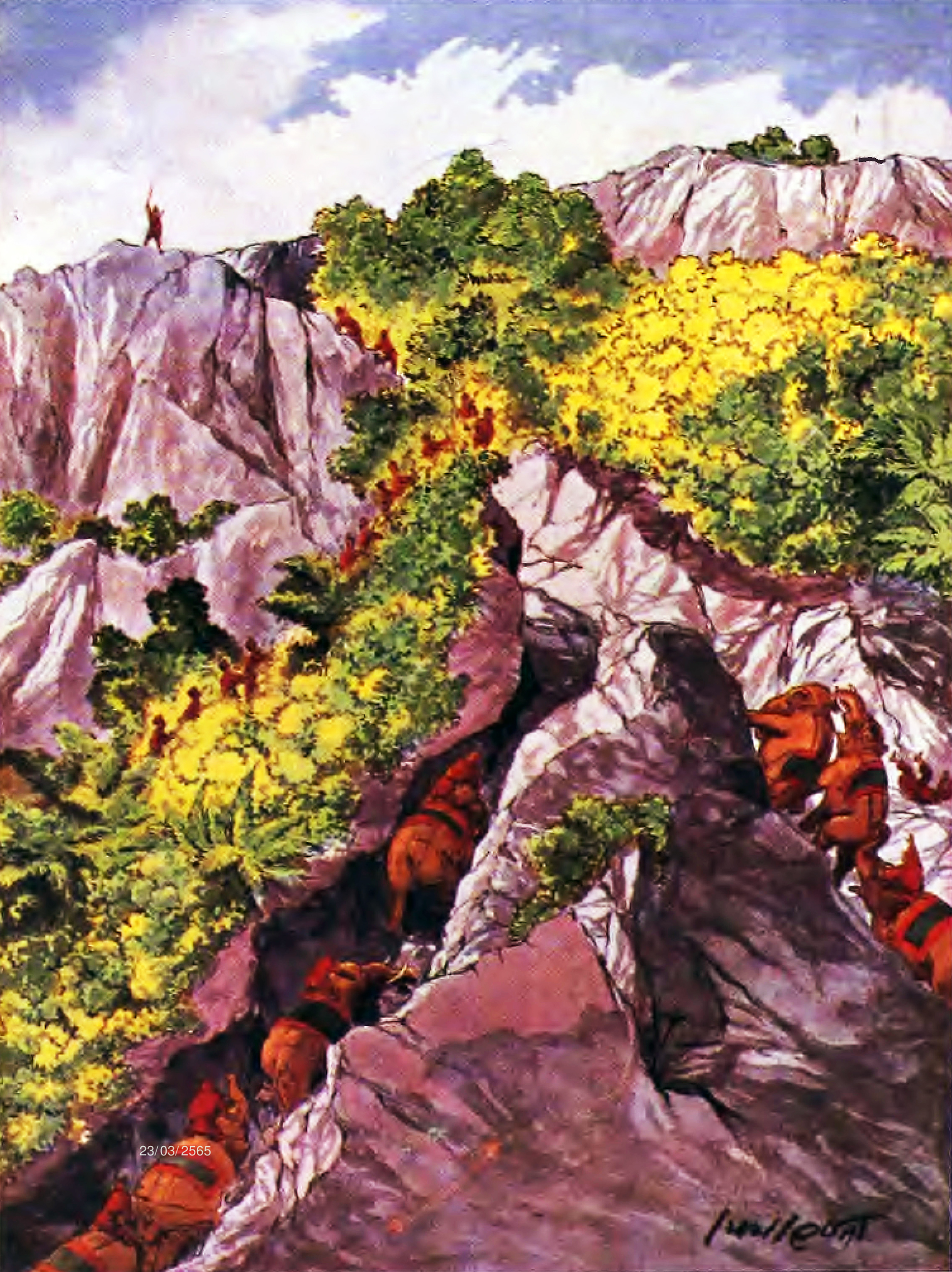
- The advance of the Siamese elephant-mounted forces along the Banthat Range, painted by Hem Vejakorn.
Date	1788
Location	Tenasserim Coast
Result	Burmese defensive victory

Belligerents
Konbaung dynasty (Burma)	Rattanakosin Kingdom (Siam)

Commanders and leaders
Maha Thiri Thihathu	Rama I

The Tavoy campaign of 1788 was a conflict between the Kingdom of Burma under Konbaung dynasty and the Kingdom of Siam under the Chakri dynasty over the town of Tavoy and the Tenasserim Coast.

== Background ==
The Tenasserim Coast had been battlegrounds of the vying for control between Burma and Siam since the sixteenth century. Tenasserim Coast consisted of two parts; the northern part centered on the town of Tavoy and the southern part centered on the town of Tanintharyi (Thai: ตะนาวศรี, RTGS: Tanao Si). At the mouth of the Tenasserim River laid the port city of Mergui, which was an important Siamese trading port during the reign of King Narai. The Tenasserim Coast was known as "Tavoy, Mergui and Tenassserim" in Thai sources. The inhabitants of Tavoy were called "Tavoyan" as a distinct ethnicity and might relate to the Mon people. The inhabitants of Tanintharyi were Siamese or Siamese-Mon mixture. A seventeenth-century account stated that the inhabitants of Mergui were "Burmese, Siamese, Chinese, Indian, Malay and European".

During the Burmese–Siamese War (1568–1569), the Burmese under King Bayinnaung gained control over Tavoy, Tanintharyi and the whole coast from the Siamese. King Naresuan of Siam regained the coast in 1592. Later King Anaukpetlun of the Burmese Toungoo dynasty retook Tavoy. The Tenasserim Coast then became separated into two portions; the northern Tavoy portion under Burmese domination and the southern part, comprising Tanintharyi and Mergui, under Siamese control. This power balance existed for about one hundred years.

The Mon rebellions in the eighteenth century toppled the Burmese Toungoo dynasty and established the Restored Hanthawaddy Kingdom. The Burmese recovered themselves under the Konbaung dynasty who ended the Hanthawaddy Kingdom and realized the importance of keeping Lower Burma and the Tenasserim Coast under control to prevent further Mon rebellions. The Burmese Konbaung dynasty suppressed the Mon people who, in great number, took refuge on the Tenasserim Coast and in Siam. Siam indirectly supported the Mon rebels by providing them with shelters. King Alaungpaya of Konbaung dynasty invaded Siam in the Burmese–Siamese War (1759–60) and conquered Mergui and Tanintharyi. The whole coastline of Tenasserim then came under Burmese control. During the Nine Armies' War (1785-86), King Bodawpaya of Burma used the Tenasserim Coast the base for his expeditions into Siam.

== Siamese Invasion of Tavoy (1788) ==
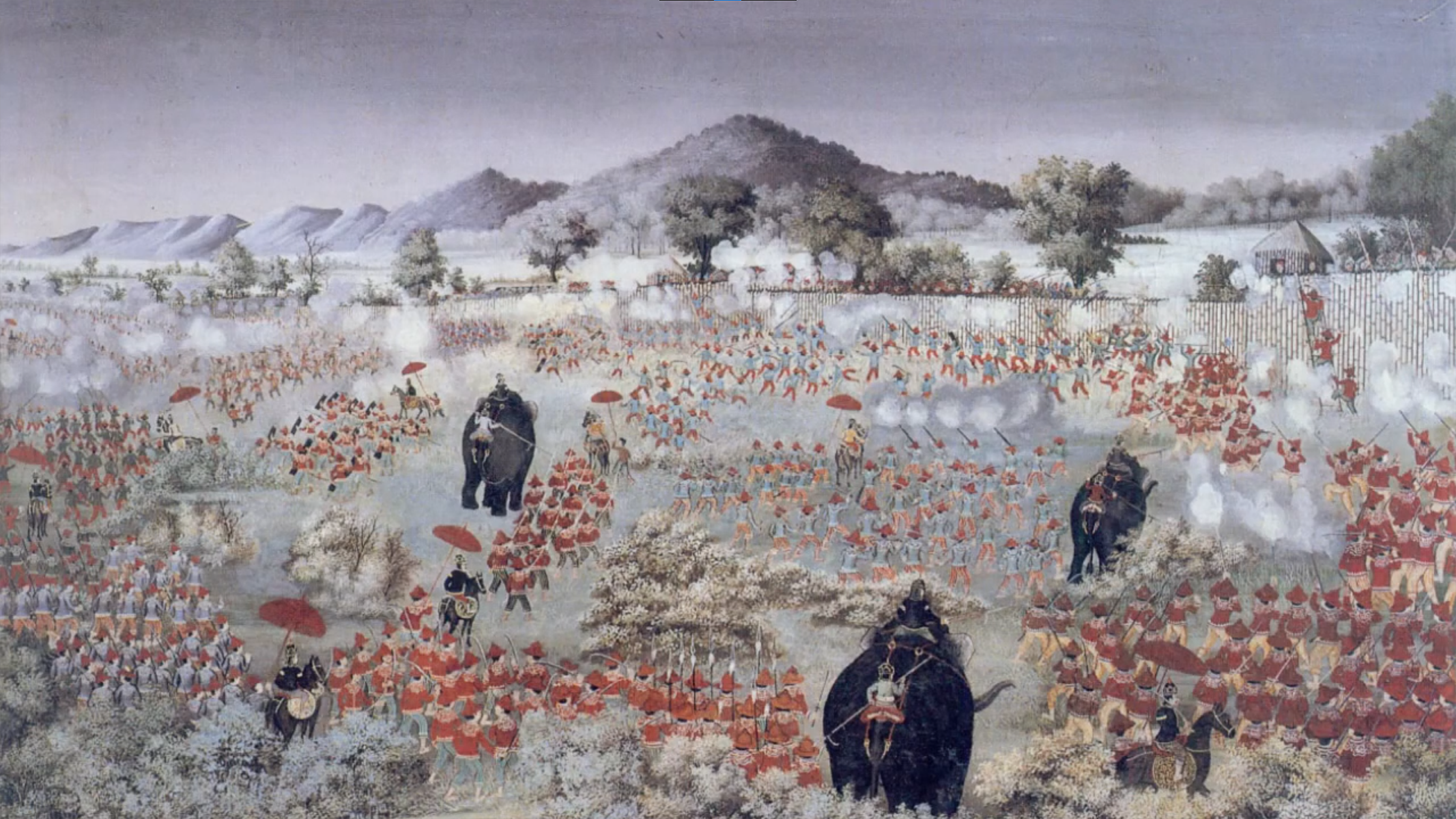
Battle of Kaleinaung in Tavoy campaign (1788)

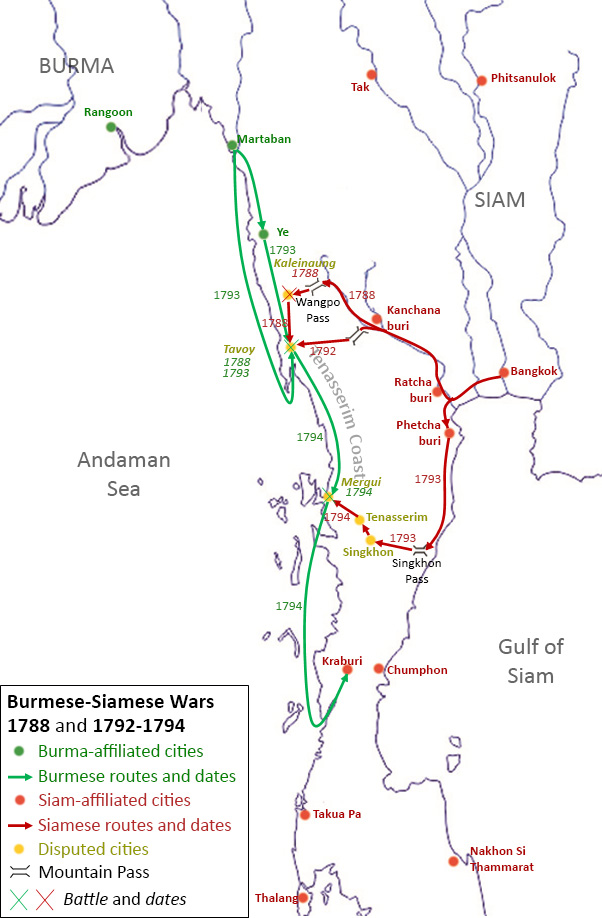
Map of the war

After the Burmese defeat in the Nine Armies' War, the power balance on the Tenasserim Coast shifted in favor of the Siamese who went on their offensives. King Rama I of Siam, along with his generals, marched to Tavoy in January 1788. He sent his two generals Chao Phraya Mahasena Pli and Chao Phraya Rattanapipit ahead as vanguard. The Siamese troops crossed the Tenasserim Hills at modern Pilok, Thong Pha Phum District, Kanchanaburi Province. Steeped mountains of the route hindered transportations. King Rama I himself had to climb through the ropes to reach the mountaintop. The two Siamese generals defeated the Burmese led by Natmilin in the Battle of Kaleinaung. King Rama I then laid siege on Tavoy, leading to the siege of Tavoy that lasted for half a month. The town of Tavoy was defended by the Burmese general Maha Thiri Thihathu ("Kinwun Mingyi" in Thai sources) and Nemyo Kyawdin the governor of Tavoy. The Burmese did not yield and King Rama I finally decided to retreat.

== Aftermath ==
=== Defection of Nemyo Kyawdin to Siam ===
Nemyo Kyawdin the governor of Tavoy (personal name Nga Myat Pyu, known as Myinzaingza in Thai sources), who had successfully defended the town from the invading Siamese, wished for himself to be appointed to the governorship of Martaban. However, King Bodawpaya instead made Minhla Sithu as the governor of Martaban that had authorities over Tavoy. The relations between Nemyo Kyawdin and Minhla Sithu were not good and Minhla Sithu reported to King Bodawpaya. King Bodawpaya ordered Nemyo Kyawdin relieved of his governorship and arrested for trials at Amarapura. When the new governor arrived in Tavoy, Nemyo Kyawdin had him killed. King Bodawpaya declared Nemyo Kyawdin a rebel and arrested his father Metkaya Bo. Myinzaingza Nemyo Kyawdin then decided to defect to the Siamese cause against King Bodawpaya.

Lady Chi, a lost niece of King Rama I (she was a daughter of an elder brother of King Rama I), had been captured as captive and deported to Tavoy during the Fall of Ayutthaya. Nemyo Kyawdin found out her existence. Nemyo Kyawdin wrote a letter inscribed on a gold plate to King Rama I to submit to Siam in March 1792. He also had Lady Chi write another letter to the Siamese king. King Rama I, upon seeing the letters of Nemyo Kyawdin and his niece Lady Chi, was determined to take Tavoy. This led to the Burmese–Siamese War (1792–1794).
