= Khin One =

Burmese multi-media artist (1947–2000)

The One Khin One
- Born: Khin One; November 24, 1947; Pyay, Bago Region, Myanmar
- Died: February 3, 2000 (aged 52); Pyay, Bago Region
- Education: Yangon University
- Occupations: Singer, writer, painter
- Known for: Na Di Min Gala song
- Style: hippi
- Spouse: Khin Lay Myint
- Children: 4

Khin One (Burmese: ခင်ဝမ်း; November 24, 1947 — February 3, 2000) was a Burmese painter, writer, and singer. He was the author of the book Scatetasa Panchi which was released in the 1970s.

One released 12 albums, including popular songs, "Hnin", "The Irrawaddy", "Amay," "Pyi Hmar Saung", "Pann Khayan Pyar", "King of Arrows", and "Seven States".

== Early life ==
On October 24, 1947, One was born in Pyay, Bago Region, Myanmar, as the son of Aung Khin, a Japanese engineer. He came to Myanmar to work during World War II, during Thakin Ba Thein Tin's rule of Burma. He studied zoology at Yangon University.

== Career ==
One began exhibiting his paintings at the School Art Exhibition in 1969. At that time, he worked as an artist. In January 1971, he published Scatetasa Panchi. In June of that year, he translated Chinese author Maw Tun's "Episode" for Moe Wei Magazine, under the title Mirror of Life. He illustrated the novel himself and translated it under the pen name San Kyi Kyawt. He also self-published and translated Albert Camus' novel The Guest in Moe Wei Magazine.

In March 1973, he wrote a painting article in the People's Star Journal entitled Automotive Sceenzain, about the American author Gartrustin in Phyu, Nyi, Nyo, Pyar Magazine. On August 6 of that year, the Myetnhar Scaim Solo Art Exhibition was shown at Thein Phyu Road, Doctors Association Building, Yangon. He also held the Arrow King Solo Art Exhibition at The Lokanat Gallery in Yangon. In 1973 he founded East Village with Kyi Twe, an art training school in Yangon, headed by Sein Khin Maung Yee. He worked as an art instructor at that school along with a music instructor, Saung Ko Thein Pe.

== Albums ==
- (Burmese: နှင်းဆီဖြူရဲ့ အဝေးကလူတစ်ယောက်)
- (Burmese: ပြည်မှာဆောင်း) 1979
- (Burmese: အိပ်မက်)
- (Burmese: စိတ်ကြိုက်ပြန်ဆိုတေး)
- (Burmese: ပန်းခရမ်းပြာ)
- (Burmese: အမှောင်ကို ထွန်းညှိမယ့်မီးအိမ်)
- (Burmese: လိုတရ အကြည့်)
- (Burmese: မင်းလျှောက်ခဲ့တဲ့လမ်း)
- (Burmese: ခင်ဝမ်း အကောင်းဆုံးသီချင်းများ)
- (Burmese: ခင်ဝမ်း လက်ရွေးစင်-၁)
- (Burmese: ခင်ဝမ်း လက်ရွေးစင်-၂)
- (Burmese: တဖန်ပြန်လည်၍ ဖြတ်သန်းခြင်း)

== Personal life ==
In September 1969, One married Khin Lay Myint. They had four children.

== Death ==
On February 3, 2000, One died in Yangon, Myanmar.
