= Pyay District =

District in Bago region, Myanmar

Coordinates: 18°42′N 95°22′E

Pyay District (Burmese: ပြည်ခရိုင်) is a district of the Bago Region in central Burma (Myanmar). The capital lies at Pyay.

location in Bago region

== Townships ==
Townships in Pyay District Pyay Township Padaung Township Shwedaung Township Paukkaung Township

The district contains the following townships:

- Padaung Township
- Pyay Township
- Paukkaung Township
- Shwedaung Township
