= Pyay University =

Higher education institute in Bago Region, Myanmar

Coordinates: 18°49′35″N 95°13′36″E

- ပြည်တက္ကသိုလ် IPA: [jàɰ̃ɡòʊɰ̃ tɛʔkəθò]
- Established: November 11, 1999; 26 years ago
- Location: Shwetachaung Road, Nawin Quarter, Pyay Township, Bago Region, Myanmar, West Bago Region, Myanmar
- Website: http://www.pyayuniversity.edu.mm/

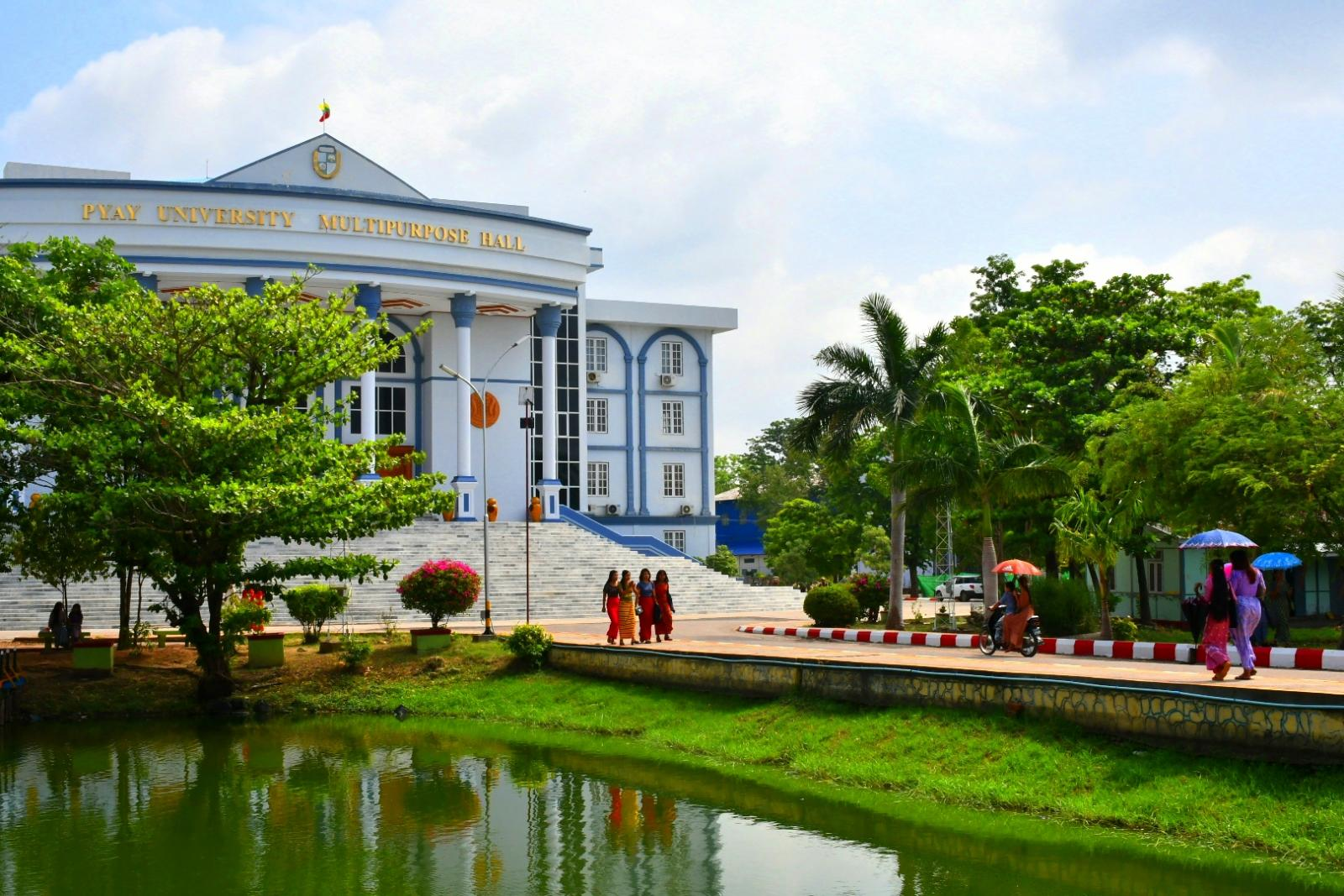
Pyay University Multi-purpose Hall

Pyay University (Burmese: ပြည်တက္ကသိုလ်) is a university located in Pyay City, in the Bago Region of Myanmar. Pyay University was founded as a college. On November 11, 1999, it was opened as a university. The 49.81-acre (20.16 ha) university campus in the city center comprises multi-purpose hall, library, lecture halls, recreation center, sports facilities, staff housing, university post office and so on. It is the only Arts and Science University in Bago West Region. It offers Bachelor of Arts (BA) and Bachelor of Science (BSc), Master of Art (MA) and Master of Science (MSc) programs.

For Ph.D. degrees, students must enroll in the University of Yangon.
