= Myanmar Academy of Arts and Science =

Educational institution

Coordinates: 16°49′35″N 96°08′02″E

- မြန်မာနိုင်ငံဝိဇ္ဇာနှင့် သိပ္ပံပညာရှင်အဖွဲ့
- Abbreviation: MAAS
- Official language: Burmese and English
- Chairman: Dr Thein Myint
- Vice-Chairman: Kyi Kyi Hla

The Myanmar Academy of Arts and Science (Burmese: မြန်မာနိုင်ငံဝိဇ္ဇာနှင့် သိပ္ပံပညာရှင်အဖွဲ့, abbreviated MAAS) is Myanmar's national academy of sciences and humanities.

The academy convenes an annual research conference. MAAS also publishes a research journal, the Journal of the Myanmar Academy of Arts and Science.

== Leadership ==
MAAS' chairman is Than Oo. Its vice-chairman is Kyi Kyi Hla.
