= Pyay Township =

Township in Bago Region, Myanmar

Coordinates: 18°50′28″N 95°15′13″E

Pyay Township Thayakhittayar
- Township
- Location in Pyay district
- Country: Myanmar
- Region: Bago Region
- District: Pyay District
- Capital: Pyay
- Time zone: UTC+6.30 (MMT)

Pyay Township or Prome Township is a township in Pyay District in the Bago Region of Myanmar. The principal town is Pyay.
