= Burmese–Siamese War (1785–1786) =

18th century war in Southeast Asia

- Part of the Burmese–Siamese wars
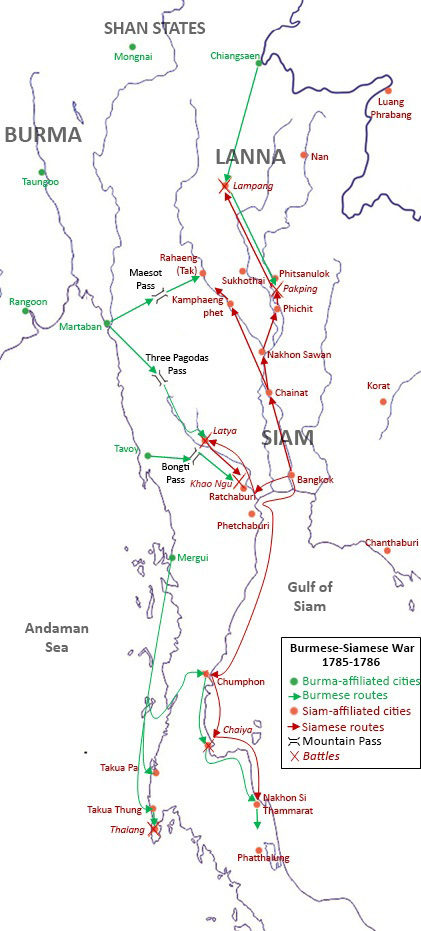
- Green represents Burmese routes. Red represents Siamese routes.
Date	July 1785 – March 1786; September 1786 – March 1787 (Tha Dindaeng campaign)
Location	Western, Northern and Southern Siam, Lan Na
Result	Siamese defensive victory; portions of Western Siam depopulated until the 1870s

Belligerents
Konbaung dynasty (Burma)	Rattanakosin Kingdom (Siam); Lanna Kingdom

Commanders and leaders
Bodawpaya; Prince Thado Thiri Maha Uzana; Prince Thado Minsaw; Prince Thiri Damayaza; Maha Thiri Thihathu; Nemyo Nawrahta; Nawrahta Kyawgaung; Minhla Kyawdin; Mingyi Maha Mingaung; Nemyo Sithu; Nemyo Gonnarat	Rama I Prince Maha Sura Singhanat; Prince Anurak Devesh; Prince Chakchetsada; Prince Thepharirak; Phraya Kalahom Ratchasena; Phraya Chasaenyakorn; Chao Phraya Mahasena Pli; Chao Phraya Rattanapipit; Chao Phraya Kawila; Chao Phraya Thamma Boonrot; Chao Phraya Nakhon Phat; Lady Chan and Lady Mook

Strength
134,000–144,000	70,000 (~50,000 engaged)

Casualties and losses
70,000	15,000

The Burmese–Siamese War (1785–1786), known as the Nine Armies' Wars (Thai: สงครามเก้าทัพ) in Siamese history because the Burmese came in nine armies, was the first war between the Konbaung dynasty of Burma and the Siamese Rattanakosin Kingdom of the Chakri dynasty.

King Bodawpaya of Burma pursued an ambitious campaign to expand his dominions into Siam. In 1785, three years after the foundation of Bangkok as the new royal seat and the Chakri dynasty, King Bodawpaya of Burma marched massive armies with total number of 144,000 to invade Siam in nine armies through five directions including Kanchanaburi, Ratchaburi, Lanna, Tak, Thalang (Phuket), and the southern Malay Peninsula. However, the overstretched armies and provision shortages deemed the Burmese campaign failed. The Siamese under King Rama I and his younger brother Prince Maha Sura Singhanat successfully warded off Burmese invasions. By early 1786, the Burmese had largely retreated.

After the truce during the rainy season, King Bodawpaya resumed his campaign in late 1786. King Bodawpaya sent his son Prince Thado Minsaw to concentrate his forces on Kanchanaburi in only a single direction to invade Siam. The Siamese met the Burmese at Tha Dindaeng, hence the term "Tha Din Daeng campaign". The Burmese were again defeated and Siam managed to defend its western border. These two failed invasions ultimately turned out to be the last full-scale invasion of Siam by Burma.

== Background ==
Traditional rivalries and dispute over Mon rebels and the Tenasserim coast led to the Burmese-Siamese wars in the eighteenth century. In 1767, the Burmese of the newly founded Konbaung dynasty invaded and destroyed the Ayutthaya Kingdom. King Taksin of Thonburi reunited Siam in the aftermath of the destruction of the Ayutthaya government and capital. In 1774, most of the Lanna Kingdom, which had been under the Burmese rule for about 250 years, came under Siamese domination with exception of Chiang Saen still under Burmese rule. During the Burmese–Siamese War (1775–1776), Siam nearly succumbed to the Burmese forces led by General Maha Thiha Thura and Siam's manpower was depleted.

In 1782, Chao Phraya Chakri was crowned as the King Rama I of Siam and founded the Chakri dynasty. In the same year, Prince Badon Min dethroned King Phaungkaza Maung Maung and crowned himself as King Bodawpaya. King Bodawpaya began his reign with glorious military conquests. In 1784, he sent his son Prince Thado Minsaw to successfully conquer the Kingdom of Mrauk U or the Arakan Kingdom. After Arakan, King Bodawpaya turned his eyes on Siam as his next military expedition.

== Nine Armies War (July 1785 – March 1786) ==
=== Burmese preparations ===
King Bodawpaya began his Siamese expeditions in July 1785. The Burmese forces were drafted from its various tributary states, most notably the northern Shan states of Hsenwi, Mongnai, Kengtung, Banmaw, Mongkawng and Hsipaw. Bodawpaya first sent Mingyi Mingaung Kyaw to lead an army of 10,000 men to Martaban to arrange the provisions and supplies for the massive royal army and for the fleets at Mergui. However, supply shortage and line communications were the main issue for the Burmese armies. The Burmese were unable to quickly move the large number of men and provisions in time.

King Bodawpaya and his armies left Ava on November 11, 1785. When the king arrived at Martaban on December 20, he found that the supplies did not meet the demands. He ordered Mingyi Mingaung Kyaw arrested from Mergui to be brought to him in chains. After waiting for four days at Martaban, King Bodawpaya was furious that the transportation of men, horses and elephants across the Salween River was delayed and had not been completed. He struck a spear at one of his generals, wounding him. Only with the beseeching of the governor of Kawthanti that the royal temper was cooled down. After staying in Martaban for a month, King Bodawpaya and his royal forces left Martaban on January 19, 1786, towards the Three Pagodas Pass.

=== Siamese preparations ===
In November 1785, three Burmese men were captured by the Karens of Kyaukkaung. The captured Burmese revealed to Siamese authorities that King Bodawpaya was planning a massive invasion of Siam in multiple directions. King Rama I convened a council of royal princes and ministers to discuss the situation. The Siamese then sent a Burmese man named Nga Gan, who was a former retainer of King Bodawpaya captured by the Siamese, to negotiate with King Bodawpaya at the Three Pagodas. King Bodawpaya, however, was not interested in peace-making and instead inquired Nga Gan about Siamese preparations. The Bangkok court then sent warnings to various cities in Northern and Southern Siam about the impending invasions.

== Nine Armies War: Order of battle ==
Order of battle
Burmese	Siamese
King Bodawpaya organizes his armies to invade Siam in five different directions. Thai sources, however, counted the Burmese armies as nine armies. The total massive number of Burmese armies was 144,000 men. Here is the organization of the Burmese armies following the traditional Thai narrative;	While supply shortage was the problem for the Burmese, lack of manpower was the main concern for the Siamese. Twenty years of nearly continuous warfare left Siam's manpower depleted and the population reduced. The Bangkok court only managed to assemble the total force of 70,000 men about a half of total number on the Burmese side. The initial defense strategy was to concentrate the forces on critical points including the western and northern fronts, while the southern front and the Malay peninsula was left mostly undefended.
The 1st Division had 10,000 men under the command of Mingyi Mingaung Kyaw. It was stationed at Myeik and were planned to take the southern provinces of Thailand. Mingyi Mingaung Kyaw was also tasked with provision supply for the royal troops, however, King Bodawpaya ordered Mingyi Mingaung Kyaw to arrested for his failure to provide adequate supplies. The division was taken over by Maha Thiri Thihathu (called "Kinwun Mingyi" in Thai sources). Later Mingyi Mingaung Kyaw was brought to King Bodawpaya, currently stationed in the Three Pagodas Pass and executed on the spot.; The 2nd Division had 10,000 men under the command of Nemyo Nawrahta (called "Anaukpet Taik Wun" in Thai sources) stationed at Tavoy. It was tasked to invade Ratchaburi and Phetchaburi. Although listed as a single division, it was divided into 3 different groups; Dawei Wun was ordered to lead a force of 3,000 men through the Chao Khawao pass in Suan Phueng; Nemyo Nawrahta himself led a force of 4,000 men through the Bong Ti pass; The remaining 3,000 men were ordered to join up with the 1st Division in Myeik.; The 3rd Division had 30,000 men under Prince Thado Thiri Maha Uzana, the king's brother, stationed at Chiang Saen. It was tasked to invade Lampang, the Lanna Kingdom and Northern Siam as a whole.; The Main Royal Army of King Bodawpaya would march from Mawlamyine to invade Siam at Kanchanaburi through the Three Pagodas Pass.; The 4th Division had 10,000 men under the command of Minhla Kyawdin as the first vanguard.; The 5th Division had 5,000 men under the command of Mingyi Maha Mingaung as the second vanguard.; The 6th Division had 12,000 men under the command of Prince Thiri Damayaza (known as Takin Gama) the king's third son; The 7th Division had 11,000 men under the command of Prince Thado Minsaw (known as Takin Sagu) the king's second son.; The 8th Division had 50,000 men directly under royal command of King Bodawpaya.; The 9th Division had 6,000 men under the command of Nawrahta Kyawgaung. It was tasked to capture Tak and invade Northern Siam.	Kanchanaburi front: Prince Maha Sura Singhanat (known in Burmese sources as Einshe Paya Peikthalok) of the Front Palace, the king's younger brother, would lead armies of 30,000 men to fend off the main armies of King Bodawpaya coming into Kanchanaburi, west of Bangkok. The prince was accompanied by his two top generals Phraya Kalahom Ratchasena and Phraya Chasaenyakorn. He was also accompanied by his half-younger brother Prince Chakchetsada and Chao Phraya Rattanapipit the Samuha Nayok.; Ratchaburi front: Chao Phraya Thamma Boonrot led an army to 5,000 men at Ratchaburi to defend against the Burmese troops coming from Tavoy.; Northern front: Prince Anurak Devesh, the king's nephew, would lead armies of 15,000 men to station at Nakhon Sawan to receive the Burmese armies coming from the north. The prince was accompanied by Chao Phraya Mahasena Pli the Samuha Kalahom and Phraya Phraklang Hon.; King Rama I himself led an army of 20,000 men stationed at Bangkok to provide relief forces for any fronts in critical conditions.

From Martaban, Bodawpaya marched his armies through the Three Pagodas Pass. He ordered fourth and fifth divisions to enter through the Three Pagodas first into Kanchanaburi, followed by sixth and seventh divisions of his two sons and then the king's own army settled in Ranti (Alante) River. The vanguard of Minhla Kyawdin and Mingyi Maha Mingaung headed for the old city of Kanchanaburi (known today as "Latya", about fifteen kilometers to the northwest of modern city of Kanchanaburi), while the two princes stationed at Tha Dindaeng and Samsop in modern Sangkhlaburi District.

== Kanchanaburi front ==
=== Prelude ===
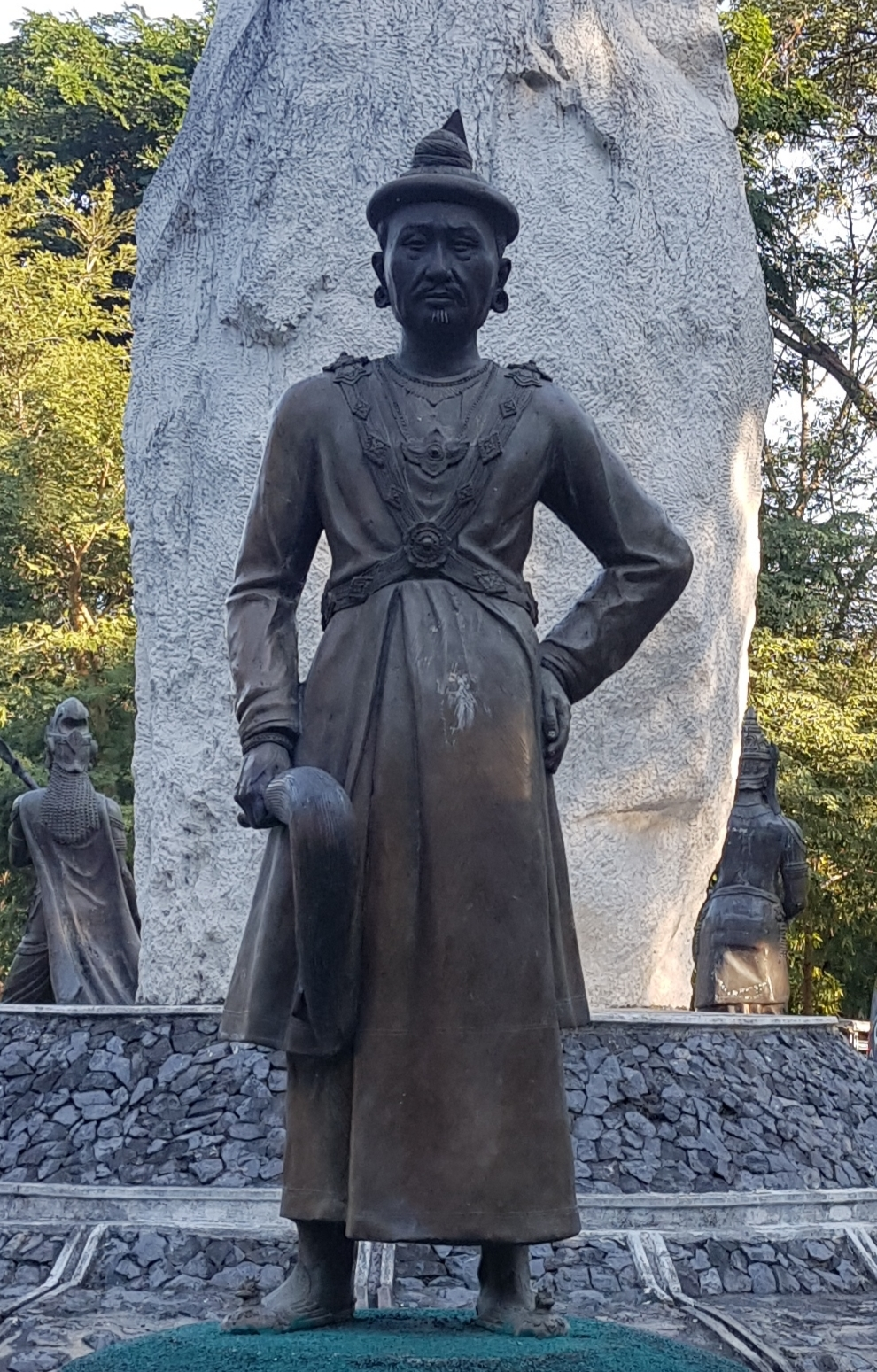
Statue of King Bodawpaya (r. 1782–1819) at Mandalay Palace. As the sixth monarch of the Konbaung Dynasty, he mobilized a massive force of nine armies in an attempt to subjugate the newly established Rattanakosin Kingdom.

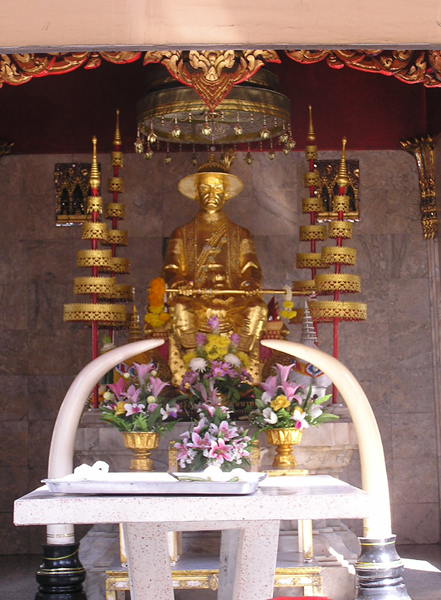
Monument of Prince Maha Sura Singhanat, the Viceroy and younger brother of King Rama I. Recognized in Burmese chronicles as 'Einshe Paya Peikthalok', he was the supreme Siamese commander on the western and southern fronts.

In December 1785, Prince Maha Sura Singhanat, the Uparat (Viceroy) of Siam, led an army of 30,000 men out of the capital to confront the Burmese invasion. By royal decree, Phraya Kalahom Ratchasena and Phraya Chasaenyakorn were appointed to command the vanguard, while Chao Phraya Rattanapipit (Son) served as the kiakkai (camp marshal) and Prince Chakchetsada acted as the yokkabat (military auditor). The Siamese forces advanced to Tambon Lat Ya in Kanchanaburi, situated at the foot of the Banthat Range. There, the Prince ordered the army to establish a defensive position on the Lat Ya plain, featuring a camp with interconnected "wings" designed to maintain a continuous line of defense. Additionally, Binnya Sein (Phraya Mahayotha) was commanded to lead 3,000 Mon troops to intercept the Burmese at Dan Kram Chang, located in what is now Erawan National Park.

The main invasion force under King Bodawpaya entered Kanchanaburi through the Three Pagodas Pass. The 4th Burmese column, led by Myin Wun, advanced via Sai Yok and crossed the Khwae Yai River at Tha Kradan. Following the river downstream to Dan Kram Chang, Myin Wun's 10,000-man force routed the Mon contingent under Phraya Mahayotha and subsequently established a camp at Lat Ya. This force was later bolstered by the 5,000-man 5th column under Myinmawun, bringing the total Burmese strength at Lat Ya to 15,000 troops.

Other segments of the Burmese army were positioned strategically: the 6th column under Prince Thiri Damayaza at Tha Din Daeng; the 7th column under Prince Thado Minsaw at Sam Sop; and the 8th column—the main royal army of King Bodawpaya—at the Ranti River. The Siamese attempted to negotiate with Bodawpaya at the Ranti River by sending Nga Kan (or Na Khan), a captive from the War of Athi Wungyi, as an envoy, but the mission was unsuccessful. Despite their strategic positions, the Burmese forces suffered from severe logistical failures and provision shortages. The large host was unable to secure enough local supplies, and the difficulty of transporting provisions from distant regions significantly hampered the vanguard's operations.

=== Battle of Thung Lat Ya ===
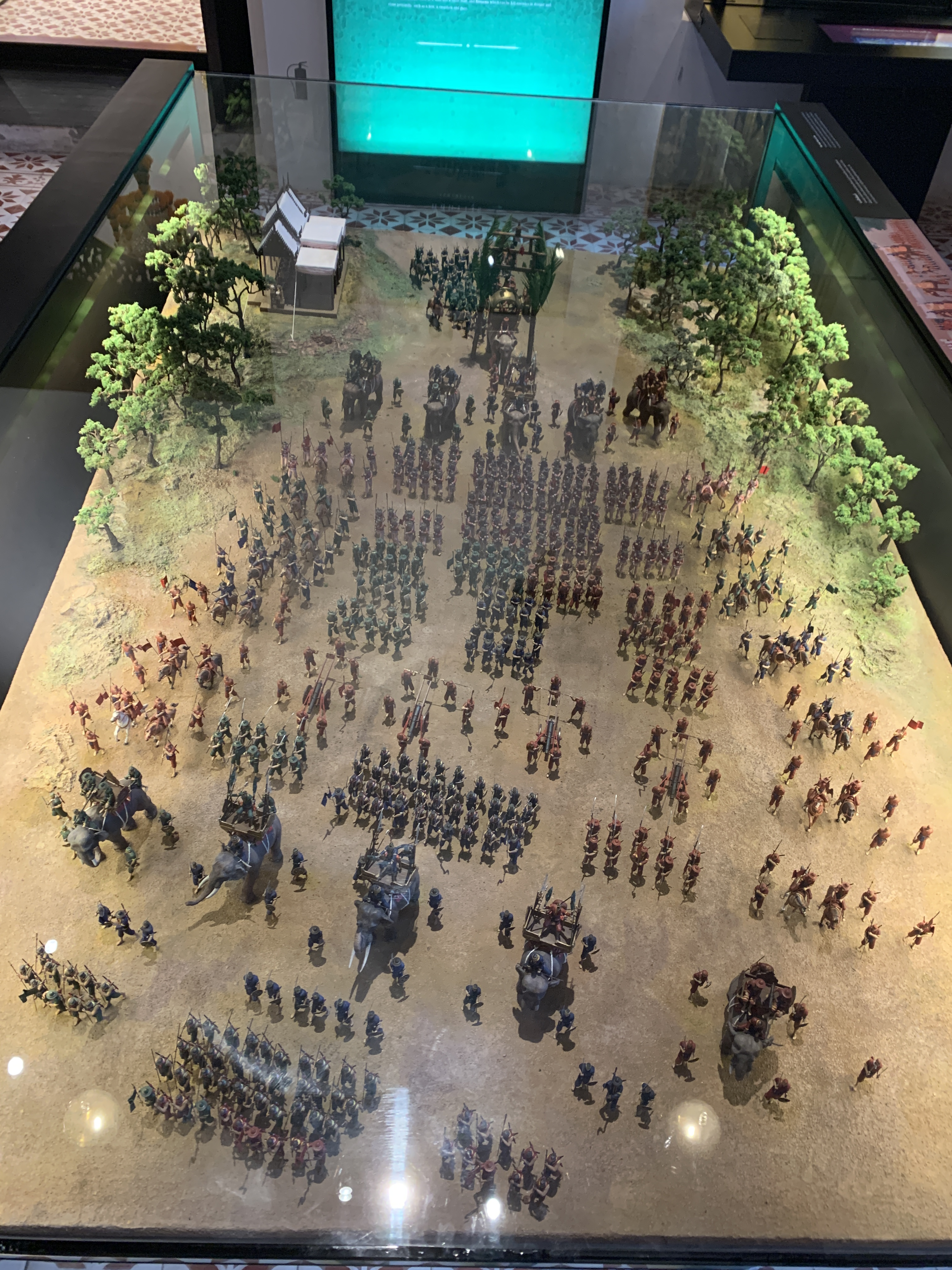
The Siamese battle formation at the Battle of Thung Lat Ya, Bangkok National Museum

Maha Sura Singhanat sent a Siamese army to attack the Burmese, but the Burmese were able to repel the Siamese attack. Both sides started building towers to place cannons on top to bomb each other. Both sides suffered heavy losses. To dissuade the Siamese soldiers from retreating, Maha Sura Singhanat built 3 large mortars and announce that if anyone retreats, they will be crushed by them.

Prince Maha Sura Singhanat noticed the Burmese supply lines were thin so he sent 500 men under the command of Phraya Siharatdecho, Phraya Tai Nam, and Phraya Phetchaburi to go ambush the Burmese supply lines at Phu Krai Sub-district. These men were too afraid to attack the Burmese army so they hid. They were later caught and beheaded. Maha Sura Singhanat then sent a force of 1,500 men under Khun Noen to ambush the Burmese supply lines. This devastated the Burmese supply lines.

=== A stalemate ===
The battle reached stalemate and was dragged on to January 1786. Being afraid that his brother would lose the engagement, King Rama I decided to march his 20,000-men army from Bangkok in January 1786 to support Maha Sura Singhanat Lat Ya, but the prince then convinced the king to return to Bangkok because he was confident of winning the engagement.

=== Breaking the stalemate ===
The Burmese side, upon observing the royal army arriving from Bangkok, believed that the Siamese was being reinforced. Prince Maha Sura Singhanat then had his army secretly march out of Lat Ya at night and march into Lat Ya again in the day, tricking the Burmese into believing that the Siamese was reinforced. With supply lines disrupted, the Burmese at Lat Ya were starved and deprived of morale. The Burmese killed horses for meat and dug for plant roots to eat. On 18 February 1786, the Siamese staged the all-out attack against the Burmese lines. Minhla Kyawdin and Mingyi Maha Mingaung the Burmese generals, unable to withstand Siamese attacks anymore, retreat. King Bodawpaya decided to give up the campaigns and ordered the general retreat of the Burmese armies on February 21, 1786.

=== Aftermath ===
After two months of battle, the Siamese were able to repel the Burmese invasion at Lat Ya. Prince Maha Sura Singhanat ordered the Siamese to follow the retreating Burmese as far as Sangkhlaburi where the armies of the two Burmese princes were stationed. Prince Thiri Damayaza and Prince Thado Minsaw reported to King Bodawpaya at Ranti River about the defeat. King Bodawpaya then ordered the general retreat. A large number of Burmese were captured as prisoners. Thai sources mentioned that the Burmese suffered around 6,000 casualties as a result of the battle.

== Ratchaburi front ==
=== Prelude ===
Nemyo Nawrahta divided his 10,000-men army into 3 groups. Nemyo Nawrahta himself led an army of 4,000 men through the Bong Ti Pass (in modern Sai Yok District, Kanchanaburi Province) and stationed at Chom Bueng. Nemyo Nawrahta also sent his subordinate Dawei Wun to lead an army of 3,000 men to enter Ratchaburi through Suan Phueng. Dawei Wun and his army stayed at Khao Ngu, just five kilometers to the northwest of the town of Ratchaburi itself. They sustained themselves by harvesting coconuts and other fruits in the region. The remaining 3,000 troops were sent to join the 1st Division under Maha Thiri Thihathu at Myeik. Chao Phraya Thamma Boonrot, who led the Siamese army of 5,000 men in Ratchaburi town, was still unaware of these Burmese advances.

=== Battle of Khao Ngu ===
After defeating the Burmese at Lat Ya in February 1786, Prince Maha Sura Singhanat then marched to Ratchaburi. He sent his two generals Phraya Kalahom Ratchasena and Phraya Chasaenyakorn ahead as vanguard. The two generals met the Burmese at Khao Ngu and defeated Dawei Wun and the Burmese army in the Battle of Khao Ngu. Dawei Wun retreated towards Suan Phueng and was followed by the Siamese. Nemyo Nawrahta at Chom Bueng, upon seeing the defeat of Dawei Wun at Khao Ngu, also decided to retreat as soon as he had received orders from King Bodawpaya.

=== Aftermath ===
Prince Maha Sura Singhanat was angry that the Siamese general Chao Phraya Thamma Boonrot had allowed the Burmese to penetrate so deep into Ratchaburi. The prince petitioned King Rama I for Thamma Boonrot to be executed. However, as Thamma Boonrot had been a supporter in his ascension, King Rama I ordered his life to be spared. Thamma Boonrot was then whipped and paraded through the camps in shame with his head shaved. He was also stripped of his title and position as the Minister of Palatial Affairs.

== Northern front ==
=== Siege of Lampang ===
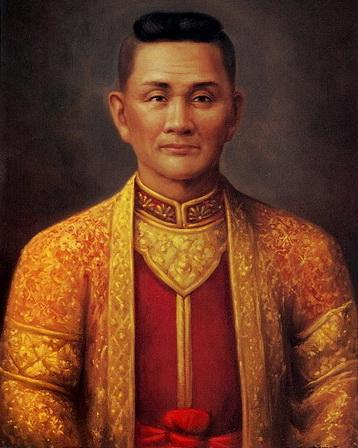
Prince Kawila of Lampang held the town against the Burmese siege for four months in 1785–86 until the Siamese provided the relief forces. He later became the ruler of Chiang Mai and was crowned as the King of Chiangmai by King Rama I in 1803.

Prince Thado Thiri Maha Uzana ventured to recruit men from the Shan States and marched the Burmese army of 30,000 men to Chiang Saen. The Burmese governor of Chiang Saen called Aprakamani also provided resources. As Chiang Mai had been abandoned since 1776, the main outpost of the Lanna Kingdom against the Burmese was Lampang. Prince Thado Thiri Maha Uzana and Aprakamani marched from Chiang Saen to attack Lampang in December 1785, leading to the siege of Lampang. Prince Kawila, the ruler of Lampang, defended the city.

=== Preludes to the Battle of Pakphing ===
Prince Thado Thiri Maha Uzana also sent his Sitke, Nemyo Sithu, to lead an army of 3,000 from Lampang down south towards the Upper Chao Phraya Plains. The governors of Sawankhalok, Sukhothai and Phitsanulok, due to manpower shortages, decided to abandon their cities and flee into the jungles as they were unable to raise armies against the Burmese. Nemyo Sithu marched through these cities unopposed and stationed his camps at Pakping, twenty kilometers to the south of the city of Phitsanulok. The 9th Division of Nawrahta Kyawgaung also entered the Chao Phraya Plains from the west through Rahaeng or modern Tak. The governor of Tak surrendered and was captured to Burma.

=== Battle of Pakphing ===
Prince Anurak Devesh marched his army of 15,000 men from Bangkok to encamp at Nakhon Sawan. He sent Chao Phraya Mahasena Pli to Phichit just south of Pakphing to face Nemyo Sithu. The Siamese army of Prince Anurak Devesh in Upper Chao Phraya Plains was at risk of being attacked from two directions; from Pakphing by Nemyo Sithu in the north and from Tak by Nawrahta Kyawgaung from the west. Prince Anurak Devesh ordered Phraya Phraklang Hon to stay at Chai Nat to defend the rear lines against possible Burmese attacks from Tak. However, as both the Burmese and Siamese took their positions, neither sides engaged.

Prince Maha Sura Singhanat and his generals returned from Ratchaburi to Bangkok in March 1786. King Rama I and Prince Maha Sura Singhanat devised the second-phase plan, in which King Rama I would lead armies to the north and Prince Maha Sura Singhanat to the south. King Rama I sent message to his nephew Prince Anurak Devesh at Nakhon Sawan, urging him to initiate the attacks against the Burmese. King Rama I marched the royal army of 30,000 men to Phichit to supervise campaigns in the northern theater, leaving Bangkok on March 10, 1786. As the king went to Phichit, Prince Anurak Devesh also moved to Phichit. King Rama I ordered another nephew Prince Thepharirak and Phraklang Hon at Chai Nat to march against Nawrahta Kyawgaung at Tak. Prince Anurak Devesh and Mahasena Pli at Phichit eventually engaged with Nemyo Sithu at Pakphing, leading to the Battle of Pakphing on 18 March 1786. The Burmese were defeated and Nemyo Sithu withdrew westward. The Burmese fled to the west crossing the Nan River where they were massacred by the pursuing Siamese and the bodies filled the river.

=== Relieving the siege of Lampang ===
After the Battle of Pakping, King Rama I ordered Chao Phraya Mahasena Pli, together with the king's half younger brother Prince Chakchetsada, to lead the Siamese army to the north to relieve the siege of Lampang. When Prince Thepharirak sent Phraklang Hon had reached Kamphaeng Phet, however, Nawrahta Kyawgaung at Tak retreated after the Burmese defeat at Pakping and the engagements did not occur. As both the Burmese of the north and west had retreated, the king and Prince Anurak Devesh returned to Bangkok.

Prince Kawila of Lampang had held out the town against the Burmese siege for four months. Mahasena Pli and Prince Chakchetsada reached Lampang in March 1786. The Siamese attacked the besieging Burmese at the rear and the Burmese Prince Thado Thiri Maha Uzana withdrew to Chiang Saen. Lampang was finally relieved from the Burmese siege. The Siamese was then able to repel the Burmese invasions in the Northern Theater.

== Thalang front ==
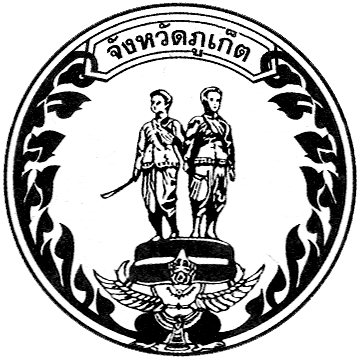
The modern Seal of the Phuket Province, featuring Lady Chan and Lady Mook, also known as Thao Thep Krasattri and Thao Si Sunthon

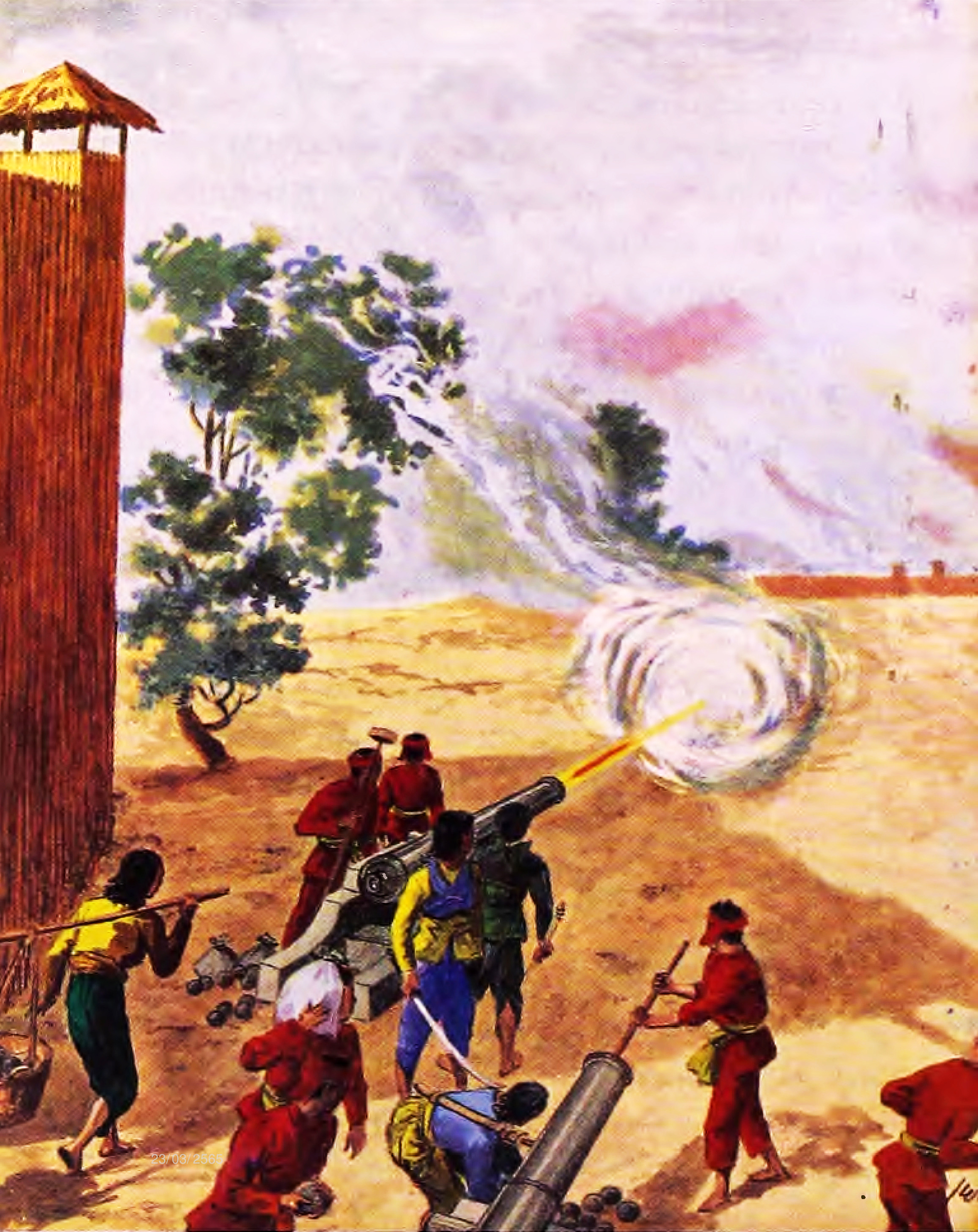
Lady Chan and Lady Mook led people of Thalang defend their city, illustrated by Hem Vejakorn (c.1969).

As the Siamese forces were concentrated on western and northern fronts, the southern Siamese cities were defenseless due to the lack of manpower and their governors were left on their own against the Burmese invasion. The Burmese general Maha Thiri Thihathu ("Kinwun Mingyi" in Thai sources) sailed the massive fleet of 10,000 men from Mergui to the Siamese Andaman Coast in December 1785. Maha Thiri Thihathu divided his armies in two routes; he sent Wungyi to lead a fleet of 3,000 men southward to attack Phuket, while himself led the rest of the army eastward across the Malay Peninsula to ravage the coast of Gulf of Siam.

=== Siege of Thalang ===
==== Background ====
The modern city of Phuket had not yet been founded (which was founded in 1827). The largest settlement on the Phuket Island back then was then the town of Thalang in the northern part of the island (in modern Thalang District). The governor of Thalang had just died from illness. Lady Chan, wife of the late governor of Thalang, was being imprisoned at Phang Nga for some charges.

Siege of Thalang

Wungyi the Burmese general quickly attacked and took the towns of Takua Pa and Takua Thung on the Andaman Coast. When the Burmese sacked Phang Nga, Lady Chan escaped and returned to Thalang. As Thalang was left with no governor, Chan and her sister Lady Muk, together with her son Thien and her cousin Thongpun the vice-governor, organized the local defense against the Burmese invasion. They established themselves at Phra Nang Sang Temple and Thung Nang Dak and managed to be armed with two great canons. Francis Light, a British merchant also supported the Thalang defenders with arquebuses. The Burmese general Wungyi led the assault on Thalang in February 1786. The defenders relied on their heavy canons to ward off the Burmese invaders. After about one month of continuous fighting, the Burmese finally retreated on March 13, 1786. Today, Lady Chan and Lady Mook are revered as national heroines.

== Southern Thailand front ==
=== Prelude ===
Maha Thiri Thihathu sailed his 7,000-men fleet to disembark at Ranong, continuing to Kraburi and crossing the Tenasserim Hills at Pakchan to attack Chumphon. Maha Thiri Thihathu sent his Sitke-gyi Nemyo Gonnarat with 2,500 men ahead as vanguard. The governors of Chumphon and Chaiya decided to abandon their towns in the face of Burmese invasion due to manpower shortage. Maha Thiri Thihathu and Nemyo Gonnarat sacked both towns and continued southward to Nakhon Si Thammarat (Ligor). Chaophraya Nakhon Phat the governor of Nakhon Si Thammarat managed to raise an army of 1,000 men to march against the Burmese at the Tapi River in modern Phunphin District. Maha Thiri Thihathu, however, had a Siamese man from Chaiya to yell at the Ligorian army that Bangkok had already fallen to the Burmese. Chao Phraya Nakhon Phat was convinced that Bangkok had fallen because by then no reinforcements had arrived from Bangkok. Nakhon Phat decided to abandon the city of Ligor and, with his family, escaped to Khao Luang – a mountain to the west of Ligor. The inhabitants of Ligor also fled into the jungles as resistance against the Burmese collapsed. Maha Thiri Thihathu took Nakhon Si Thammarat with ease, plundering the city and enslaving the native Siamese.

After taking three consecutive towns on the coast of Gulf of Siam, Maha Thiri Thihathu headed for Phatthalung next. The inhabitants of Phatthalung, upon seeing the fate of their compatriots to the north, also fled the town. A local monk named Chuai encouraged the inhabitants of Phatthalung to fight against the Burmese. Chuai the monk managed to raise an army of 1,000 men and, with himself riding on a palanquin, marched against the Burmese at Cha-uat. However, the Burmese retreated before the engagements begun because the Bangkokian army was attacking from the north.

=== Battle of Chaiya ===
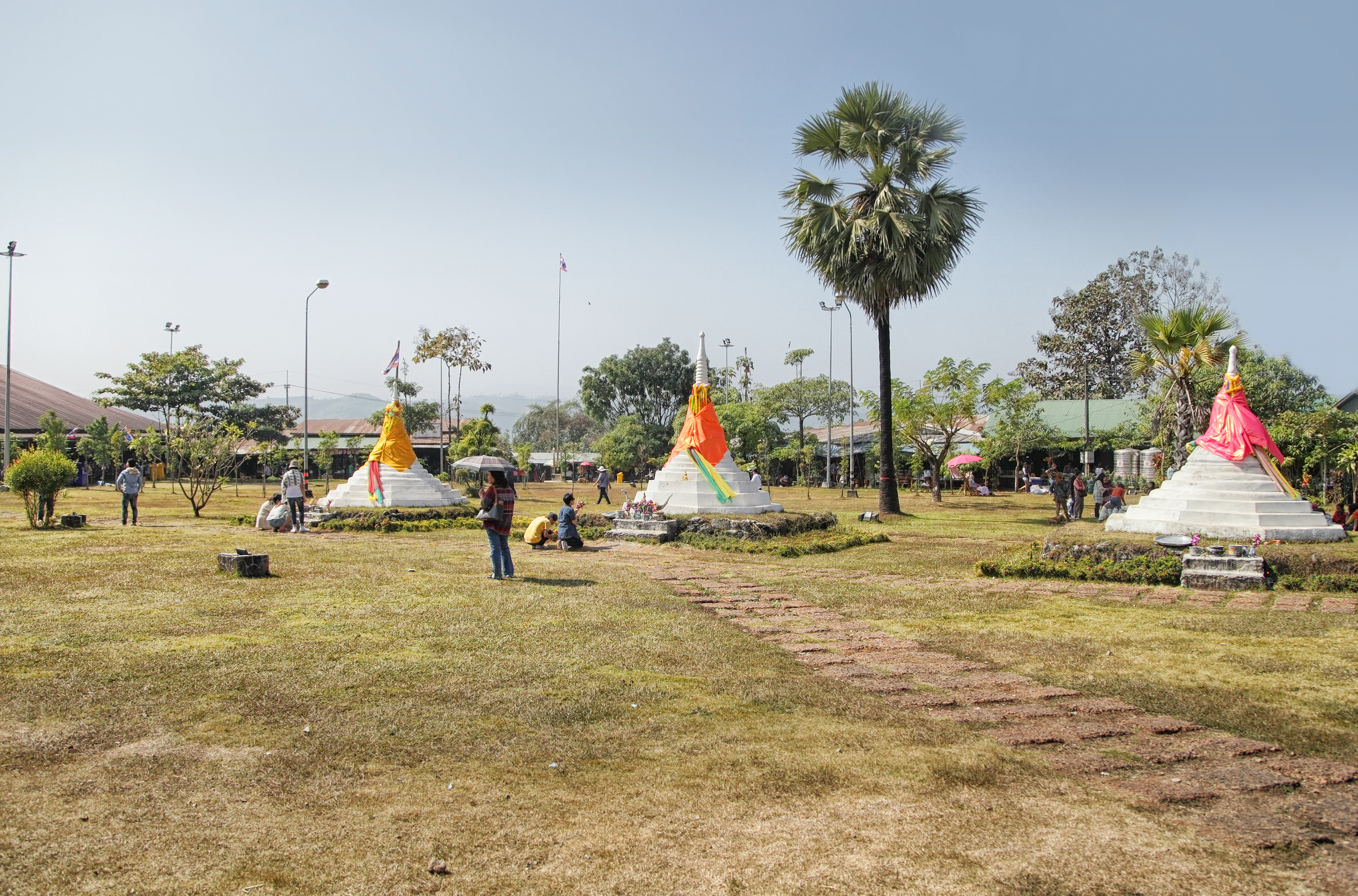
The Three Pagodas Pass, known in Burmese as "Payathonzu", was the entrance of Burmese armies into the Chao Phraya Plains of Central Thailand on many occasions in the Burmese–Siamese wars.

Prince Maha Sura Singhanat sailed his fleet of 20,000 men from Bangkok to the south, departing on March 4, 1786. The prince reached Chumphon and ordered his generals Phraya Kalahom Ratchasena and Phraya Chasaenyakorn to lead the vanguard to Chaiya. Maha Thiri Thihathu also sent Sitke-gyi Nemyo Gonnarat to Chaiya. Both sides engaged in the Battle of Chaiya. The Siamese was able to encircle the Burmese but the heavy rainfall neutralized most of the Siamese canons. Nemyo Gonnarat managed to break through the encirclement and fled westward and was closely pursued by the two Siamese generals. Many Burmese were captured as war prisoners and were brought to the prince at Chumphon. Burmese general Maha Thiri Thihathu at Ligor, upon seeing the defeat of his subordinate at Chaiya, decided to lead the Burmese to retreat westward through Krabi and back to Mergui. Prince Maha Sura Singhanat then marched to reclaim the city of Nakhon Si Thammarat.

Prince Maha Sura Singhanat ordered Chao Phraya Nakhon Phat to be brought to him for the crime of cowardice. However, Nakhon Phat was pardoned due to the inevitability of his situation and was assigned to restore the city. As the lasts of the Burmese were expelled from Southern Siam, the Nine Armies' War came to the end.

== Conclusion ==
King Bodawpaya of Burma attempted to inflict the pincer attack from many directions on Central Siam and Bangkok. However, his many armies were expected to conjoin but failed to cooperate. The lack of provision supplies was the major disadvantage on the Burmese side, as the Burmese troops were starved at Kanchanaburi. The Siamese also adopted less defensive strategy than the previous wars. Siamese forces were sent to deal with the Burmese at the borders instead of locking themselves in fortifications and allowing the Burmese to penetrate. Despite being inferior in numbers, the Siamese were able to fend off the Burmese invasions.

After the war, King Rama I awarded and promoted those who made contributions. His nephew Prince Anurak Devesh was awarded with the title Krom Phra Ratchawang Lang or the Prince of the Rear Palace. Lady Chan and Lady Muk, the heroines of Thalang, were given titles Thao Thep Krasattri and Thao Si Sunthon respectively. Chuai the monk who led the resistance against the Burmese at Phatthalung was made Phraya Tukkaraj the vice-governor of Phatthalung.

== Tha Din Daeng campaign ==
After the truce during the rainy season, King Bodawpaya resumed hostilities in late 1786. Learning from the failed nine-front invasion of the previous year, the Burmese court abandoned the multi-directional strategy and instead concentrated forces solely on the western front. King Bodawpaya assigned his son, Prince Thado Minsaw, to lead the advance toward Kanchanaburi through the Three Pagodas Pass.

The Burmese forces established forward encampments at Tha Din Daeng and Samsop in the area of present-day Sangkhlaburi, intending to secure a base for a deeper push into Siam. Siamese armies under King Rama I and Prince Maha Sura Singhanat moved to counter the invasion, and the two sides clashed at Tha Din Daeng, giving the campaign its name.

After several days of fighting, the Burmese positions were overrun. The defeat forced Burmese troops to abandon their encampments and retreat toward the frontier, bringing an end to Bodawpaya's renewed offensive. Siam successfully defended its western border, and the campaign prevented any further large-scale Burmese advance into the region.

The campaign is commemorated by a park established by the Royal Thai Army 40 kilometres (25 mi) from the town of Kanchanaburi.

== See also ==
- Burmese–Siamese wars
- Burma–Thailand relations
