= Paukkaung Township =

Township in Bago Region, Myanmar

Coordinates: 18°54′35″N 95°32′58″E

- Township
- Location in Pyay district
- Country: Myanmar
- Region: Bago Region
- District: Pyay District
- Capital: Paukkaung
- Time zone: UTC+6.30 (MST)

Paukkaung Township or Paukkhaung Township is a township in Pyay District in the Bago Region of Myanmar. The principal town is Paukkaung.
