= Shwedaung Township =

Township in Bago Region, Myanmar

Coordinates: 18°42′08″N 95°12′51″E

- Township
- Location in Pyay district
- Country: Myanmar
- Region: Bago Region
- District: Pyay District
- Capital: Shwedaung
- Time zone: UTC+6.30 (MMT)

Shwedaung (or Shwe Taung) Township is a township in Pyay District in the Bago Region of Myanmar. The principal town is Shwedaung.
