= Thado Minsaw =

Burmese heir apparent (1762–1808)

Thado Minsaw; သတိုးမင်းစော
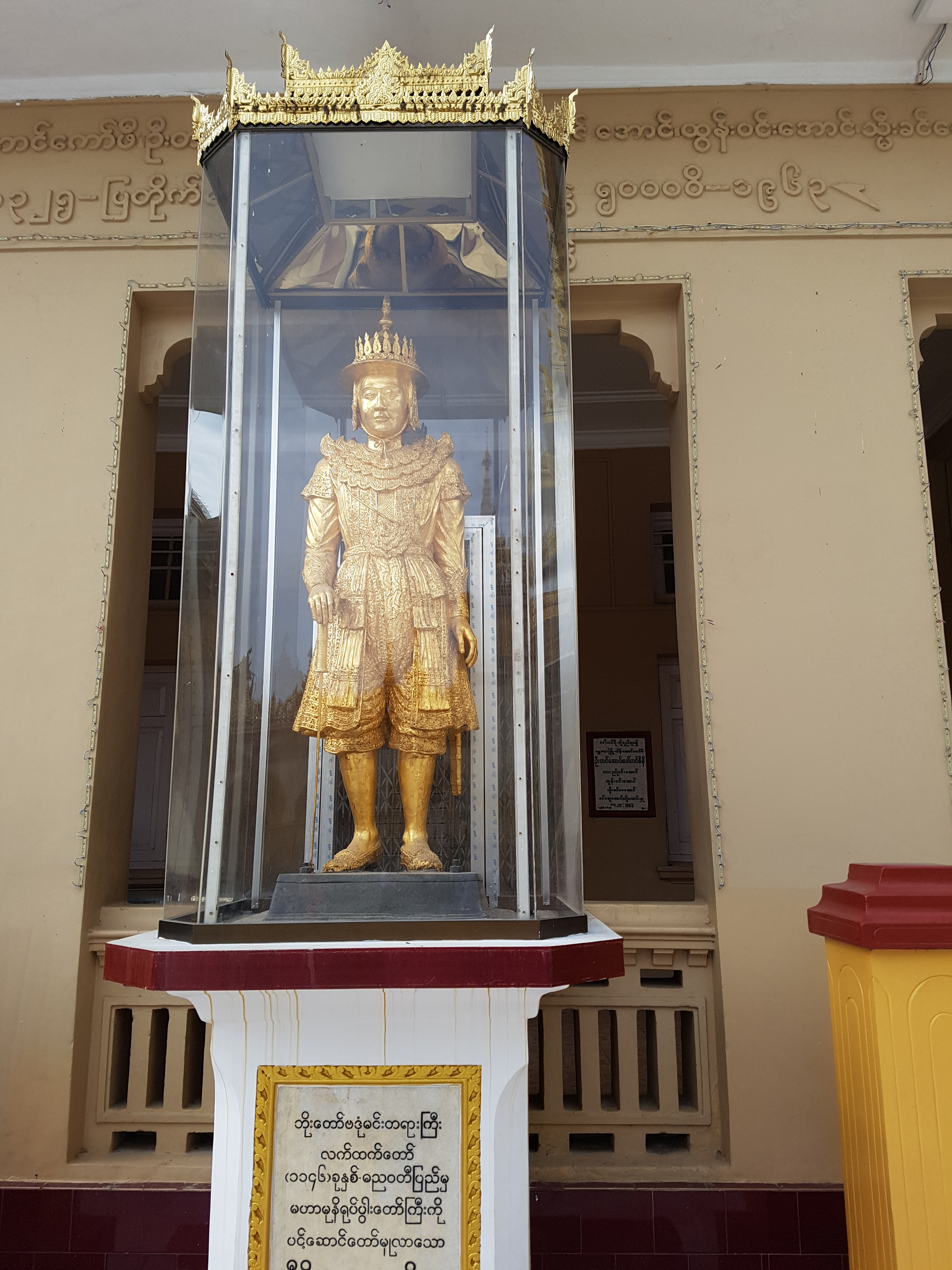
- Statue at the Mahamuni Buddha Temple, Mandalay

Heir-apparent of Burma
- Reign: 10 July 1783 – 29 March 1809
- Predecessor: Singu Min
- Successor: Bagyidaw

Prince of Shwedaung
- Reign: 30 May 1782 – 29 March 1809
- Successor: Thiri Malla Sanda Dewi (Note: Daughter of Thado Minsaw; given Shwedaung and Pinle in fief by King Bodawpaya)
- Born: 15 June 1762; Tuesday, 9th waning of Nayon 1124 ME (Note: 9th waning of Nayon 1124 ME = 15 June 1762); Shwebo
- Died: 29 March 1809 (aged 46); Wednesday, 14th waxing of Late Tagu 1170 ME (Note: 14th waxing of [Late] Tagu 1170 ME = 29 March 1809); Amarapura
- Spouse: Thiri Tilawka Maha-battathu-yadana Dewi (Min Kye) (m. 1783–1809)
- Issue: 32 sons, 26 daughters including...; Bagyidaw; Tharrawaddy
Names
- Sri Maha Dharma Vijaya Sihasura (သီရိမဟာဓမ္မဝိဇယသီဟသူရ)
- House: Konbaung
- Father: Bodawpaya
- Mother: Me Lun Thu

Thado Minsaw (Burmese: သတိုးမင်းစော [ðədó mɪ́ɰ̃sɔ́]; 15 June 1762 – 29 March 1809), also known as Shwedaung Min (ရွှေတောင်မင်း), was heir-apparent of Burma from 1783 to 1809, during the reign of his father King Bodawpaya of Konbaung dynasty. As Prince of Shwedaung and Dabayin, he was entrusted by the king to manage the day-to-day affairs of the kingdom, and when necessary, to lead the Royal Army against enemies. Thado Minsaw is best known for his conquest of Arakan (now Rakhine State) in 1784–1785 and the subsequent removal of Mahamuni Buddha from Mrauk-U to Amarapura. He also led the successful defense of Tenasserim (Taninthayi) coast in 1792 in the war with Siam. The crown prince also led the revitalization of Burmese theater in the late 18th century by bringing a group of young artists to his court.

Thado Minsaw died at age 46 in 1809, and was succeeded as crown prince by his son Prince of Sagaing (later King Bagyidaw). The rest of Konbaung kings traced lineage to him.

== Early life ==
Thado Minsaw was born Maung Paw (မောင်ပေါ်; [màʊɰ̃ bɔ̀]) to then Prince of Badon (later King Bodawpaya) and his third wife Me Lun Thu (later Queen of Northern Palace) on 15 June 1762 in Shwebo. On 30 May 1782, he was granted Shwedaung in fief. (Note: Thursday, 4th waning of Nayon 1144 ME = 30 May 1782) On 10 July 1783, he married his half-sister Princess of Taungdwin, Thiri Maha Tilawka Yadana Dewi. He was also appointed crown prince on the same day. (Note: Thursday, 12th waxing of Second Waso 1145 ME = 10 July 1783.)

== Crown prince ==
=== Conquest of Arakan ===
Thado Minsaw's first major assignment as crown prince was to lead the Burmese invasion of Arakan, an independent kingdom in the west, separated by the Arakan Yoma mountains. In October 1784, Thado Minsaw as commander-in-chief led an expedition force consisting of four divisions, totaling 30,000 men (including 2500 cavalry and 200 elephants). Three divisions crossed the Arakan Yoma from three different passes with Thado Minsaw's division crossing the mountains from its Minbu base. The fourth was a flotilla which came up from the Indian Ocean coastline from the erstwhile British base at Negrais. On the last day of the year, the Burmese forces captured the Arakanese capital Mrauk-U, ending nearly five centuries of Arakanese independence. Twenty thousand people were deported to populate the king's new capital Amarapura. In the looting and destruction that followed, much of Arakan's cultural and intellectual heritage was lost. The royal library was burned to the ground. The country was annexed and ruled through four governorships, each backed by a garrison. The Mahamuni Buddha, the very symbol of Arakanese sovereignty, was forcibly brought to Amarapura.

=== Administration ===
Though still in his twenties, Thado Minsaw came to be relied upon by his father for both domestic and military affairs. In late 1785, Thado Minsaw was entrusted to govern in Amarapura while the king personally led a large scale invasion of Siam. After the invasion, which ended in total failure, Bodawpaya handed over managing the day-to-day affairs of the kingdom to Thado Minsaw, and concentrated on religion.

=== Defense of Tenasserim ===
The crown prince was called on to service again in 1792 when the Siamese again invaded Tenasserim, the coastal region directly west of Bangkok. The Siamese forces, which also invaded the region in 1787, successfully captured Tavoy (Dawei) this time in March 1792, and laid siege to Mergui (Myeik). Thado Minsaw as commander-in-chief of a 10,000 strong force first marched down to Burmese held Martaban (Mottama) at the north of Tenasserim coast as his forward base. By December 1792, Thado Minsaw was able to drive out the Siamese from Tavoy and relieved Mergui which the Burmese governor had successfully held. Thado Minsaw left a portion of troops to guard the southeastern frontier.

=== Theater ===
The crown prince was also instrumental in revitalizing Burmese theater. In the 1780s, he brought together a circle of innovative young artists in his private court, including Maung Sa, the future Myawaddy Mingyi U Sa. In 1789, a Royal Commission consisted of princes and ministers was charged with translating Siamese and Javanese dramas from Thai to Burmese. With the help of Siamese artists captured from Ayutthaya in 1767, the commission adapted two important epics from Thai to Burmese: the Siamese Ramayana and the Enao, the Siamese version of Javanese Panji tales into Burmese Yama Zatdaw and Enaung Zatdaw.

== Death ==
Crown Prince Thado Minsaw died on 29 March 1809. He had 22 queens, 32 sons and 26 daughters. Although he was not to be king, the crown prince was father of two future kings, Bagyidaw and Tharrawaddy. The rest of Konbaung kings traced lineage to him.

== Bibliography ==
- Brandon, James R (1967). Theatre in Southeast Asia. Harvard College. ISBN 0-674-87587-7.
- Harvey, G. E. (1925). History of Burma: From the Earliest Times to 10 March 1824. London: Frank Cass & Co. Ltd.
- Phayre, Lt. Gen. Sir Arthur P. (1883). History of Burma (1967 ed.). London: Susil Gupta.
- Myint-U, Thant (2001). The Making of Modern Burma. Cambridge University Press. ISBN 9780521799140.
- Myint-U, Thant (2006). The River of Lost Footsteps—Histories of Burma. Farrar, Straus and Giroux. ISBN 978-0-374-16342-6.
- Maung Maung Tin, U (2004) [1905]. Konbaung Set Maha Yazawin (in Burmese). Vol. 1–3. Yangon: Department of Universities History Research, University of Yangon.

Thado Minsaw Konbaung Dynasty Born: 15 June 1762 Died: 29 March 1809
Royal titles
Preceded by Singu	Heir to the Burmese Throne as Prince of Shwedaung; 1783–1809	Succeeded by Bagyidaw
Preceded by	Prince of Shwedaung; 1782–1809	Succeeded by Thiri Malla Sanda Dewi as Princess of Shwedaung
