= List of Buddhist temples in Bangladesh =

This is a list of Buddhist temples, monasteries, stupas, and pagodas in Bangladesh for which there are Wikipedia articles.

== Temples ==
- Buddha Dhatu Jadi
- International Buddhist Monastery
- Kamalapur Dharmarajika Bauddha Vihara
- Misripara Seema Buddha Bihar
- Ramkot Banashram

== Archaeological sites ==
- Jagaddala Mahavihara
- Shalban Vihara
- Shita Coat Bihar
- Somapura Mahavihara
- Vasu Vihara

== See also ==
- Buddhism in Bangladesh
- Bengali Buddhists
- Madhu Purnima (Honey Full Moon Festival)
- Barua Buddhist Institutes in India and Bangladesh
- Bangladesh Bauddha Kristi Prachar Sangha
- Chittagong Pali College
- Bangladesh Sanskrit and Pali Education Board
- List of Buddhist temples
