= International Buddhist Monastery, Dhaka =

Buddhist monastery in Dhaka, Bangladesh

Coordinates: 23.7739°N 90.4261°E

International Buddhist Monastery
- আন্তর্জাতিক বৌদ্ধ বিহার
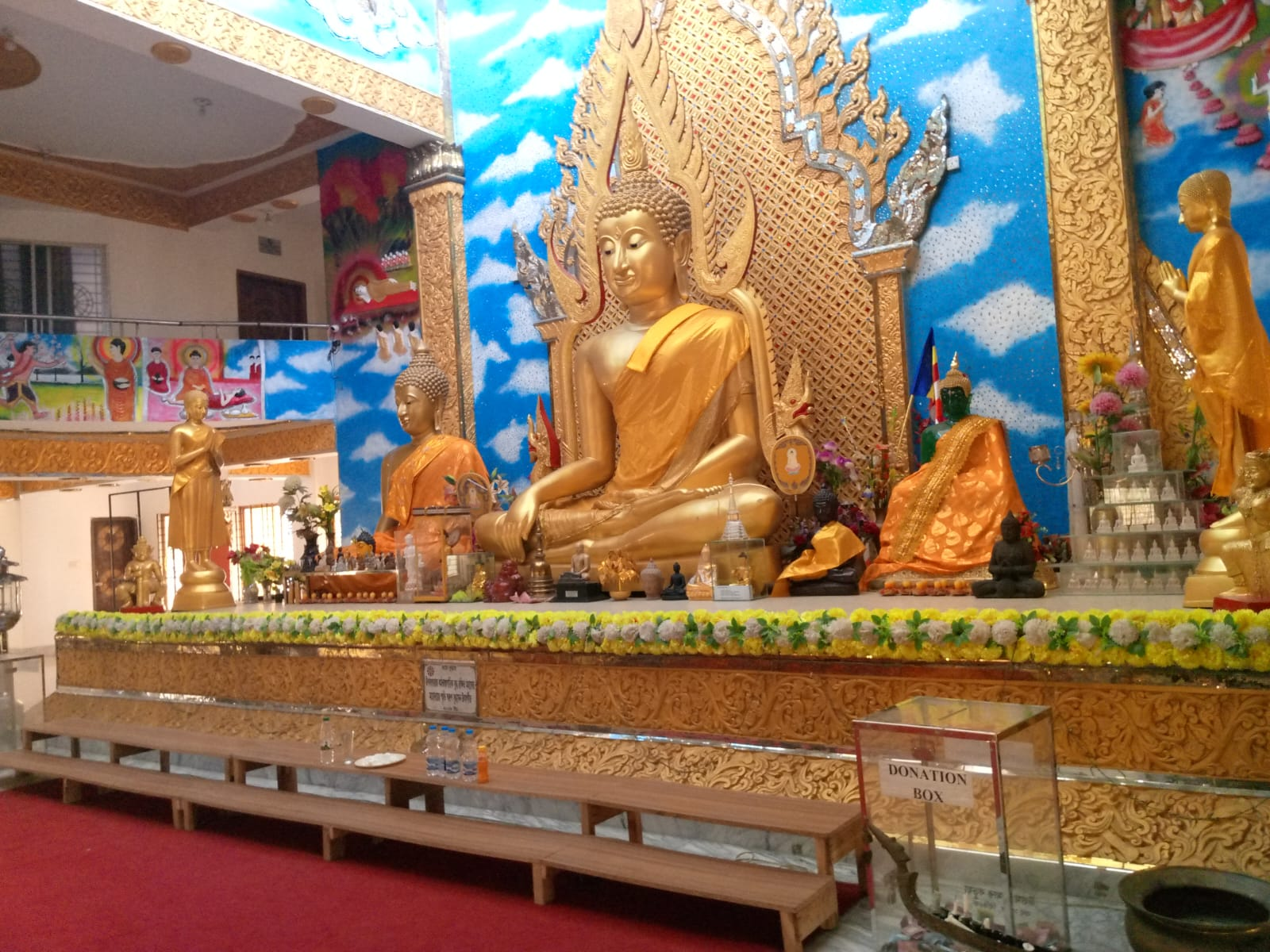
- Statue of Buddha inside the monastery

Religion
- Affiliation: Buddhism
- Sect: Theravada Buddhism
- Region: Dhaka
- Status: Active

Location
- Location: Merul Badda, Dhaka 1212, Bangladesh
- Country: Bangladesh
- Interactive map of International Buddhist Monastery

Architecture
- Founder: Sukomal Barua
- Completed: 1989; 37 years ago

The International Buddhist Monastery (Bengali: আন্তর্জাতিক বৌদ্ধ বিহার) is a Bangladeshi Theravada Buddhist monastery located at Merul Badda under Badda Thana in the capital city, Dhaka. It was established in 1981. The monastery is the headquarters of the Bangladesh Buddhist Federation.

== History ==
The temple was founded in 1981 in a rented house near the Malibag rail crossing in Dhaka, with Sundarananda Bhikkhu as its first principal. In 1982, the Dhaka International Buddhist Monastery (DIBM) Construction Committee was formed to oversee the establishment of a permanent facility. The monastery relocated to its current site in Merul Badda in 1989, where a semi-permanent structure was built on purchased land with community support. Buddha Purnima is observed in the temple every year.

The temple has hosted notable visitors, including the Thai Ambassador Makawadee Sumitmor, Vietnam Ambassador Nguyen Manh Cuong, and the Australian Acting High Commissioner Nardia Simpson in 2024.

On November 8, 2024, the monastery hosted the National Buddhist Grand Conference and the Kothin Chibar Dan ceremony. General Waker-Uz-Zaman, Chief of Army Staff, attended the event. He highlighted the monastery's role in promoting peace and harmony among various communities, including indigenous and Bengali populations in the hill tracts.

On April 13, 2025, Chief Adviser Professor Muhammad Yunus laid the foundation stone for 'Sampriti Bhaban' at the monastery. Professor Yunus emphasized the monastery's role as a symbol of unity among diverse religious communities in Bangladesh. Army chief General Waker-Uz-Zaman and religious affairs adviser Dr AFM Khalid Hossain were also present.

== Structure ==
In the temple, there are two Buddha statues from Thailand among the preserved archaeological relics. One statue is measured 4' x 6' which is made of bronze and weighs approximately 260 kg. The other one is crafted from astadhatu] An alloy of eight metals) which stands about 7' tall and weighs around 777 kg.

== Gallery ==
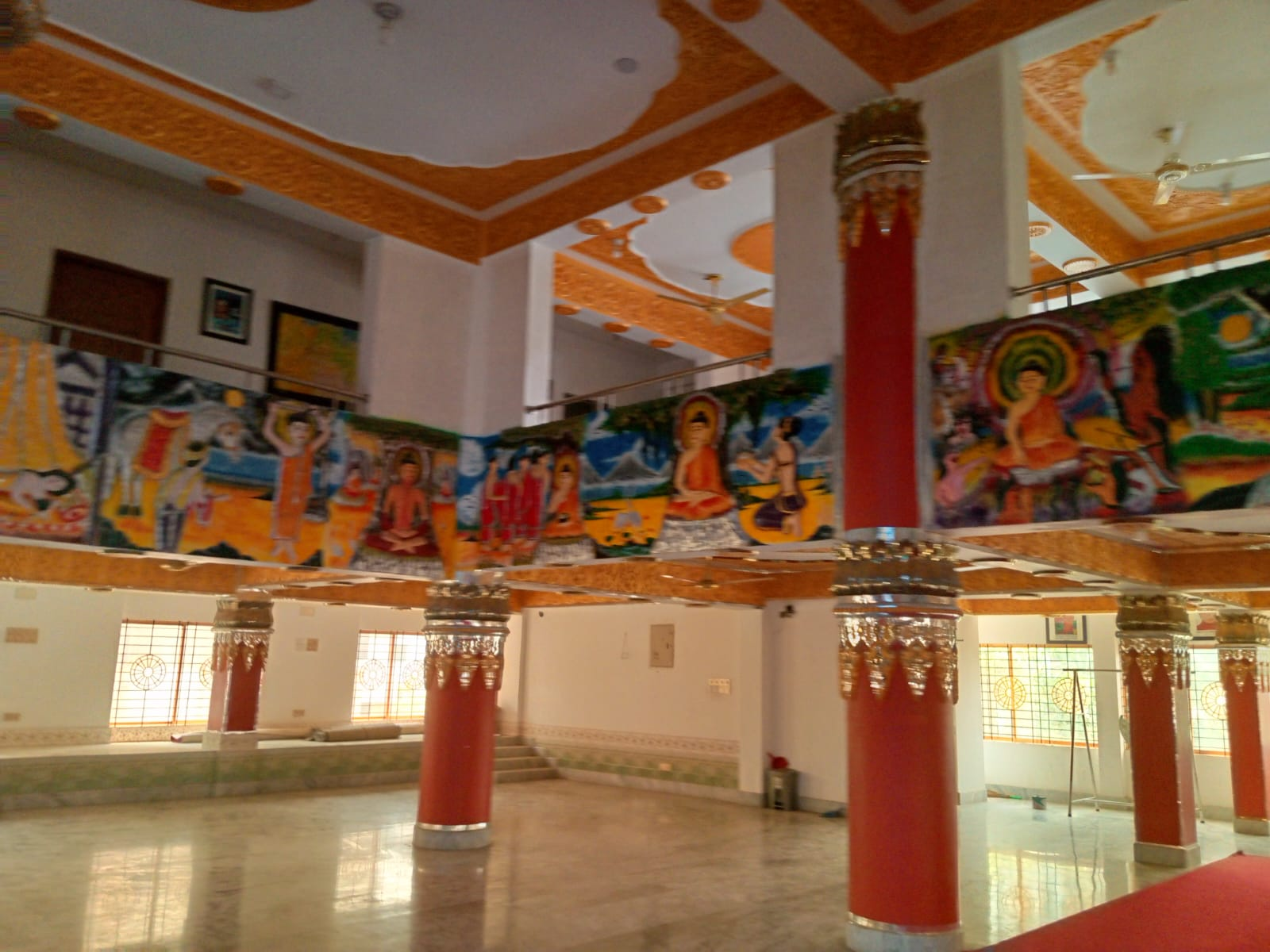

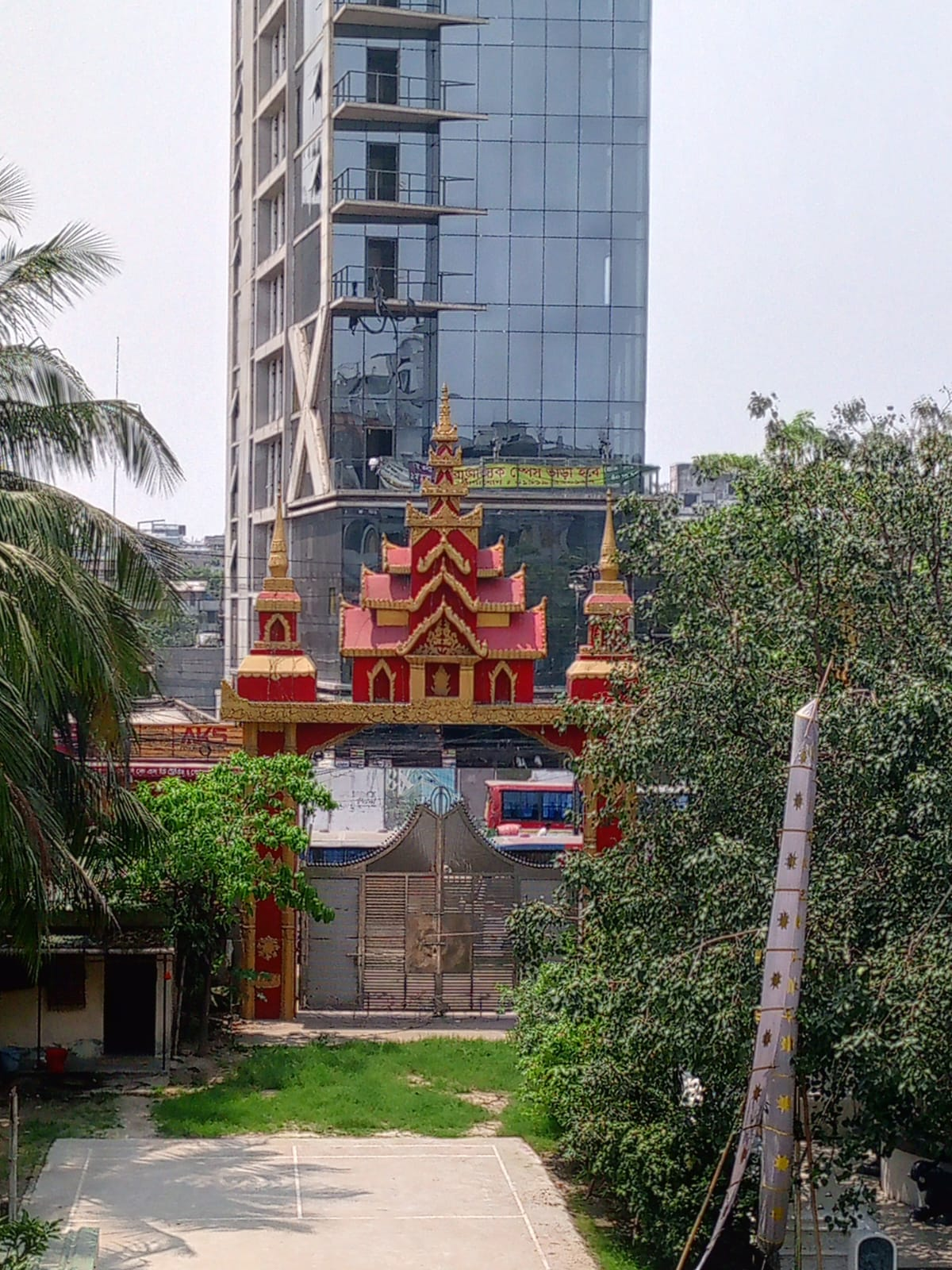

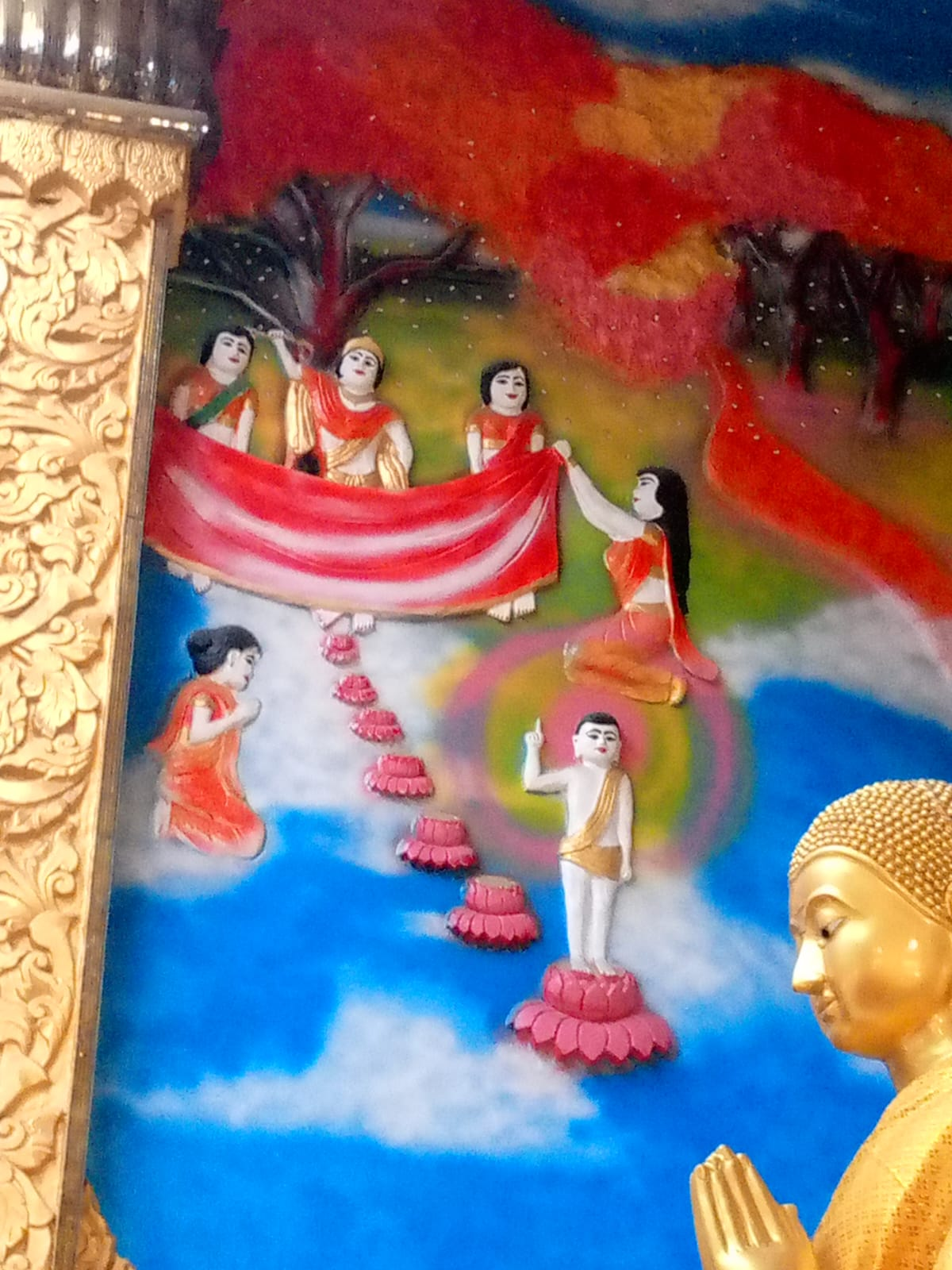

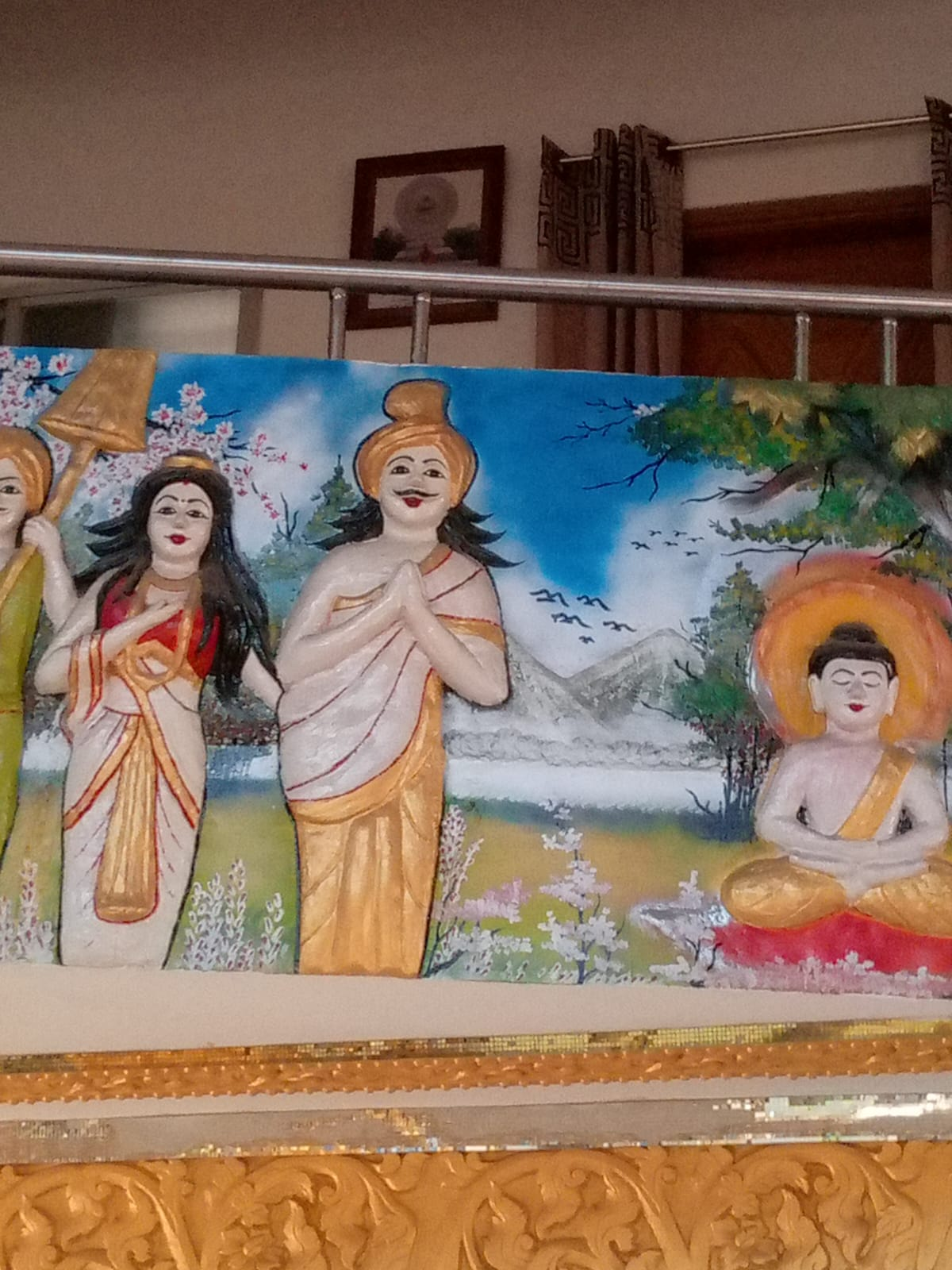

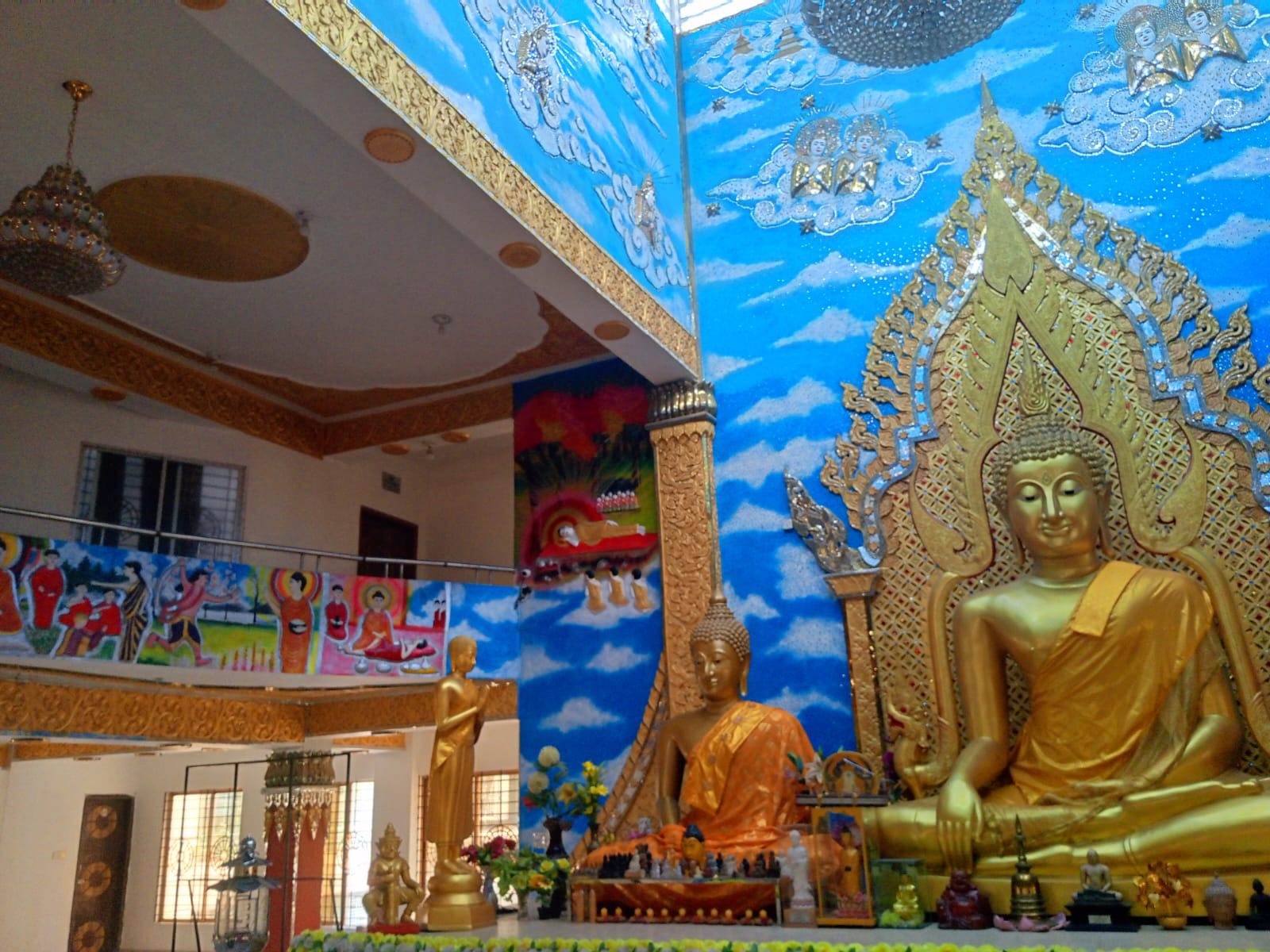

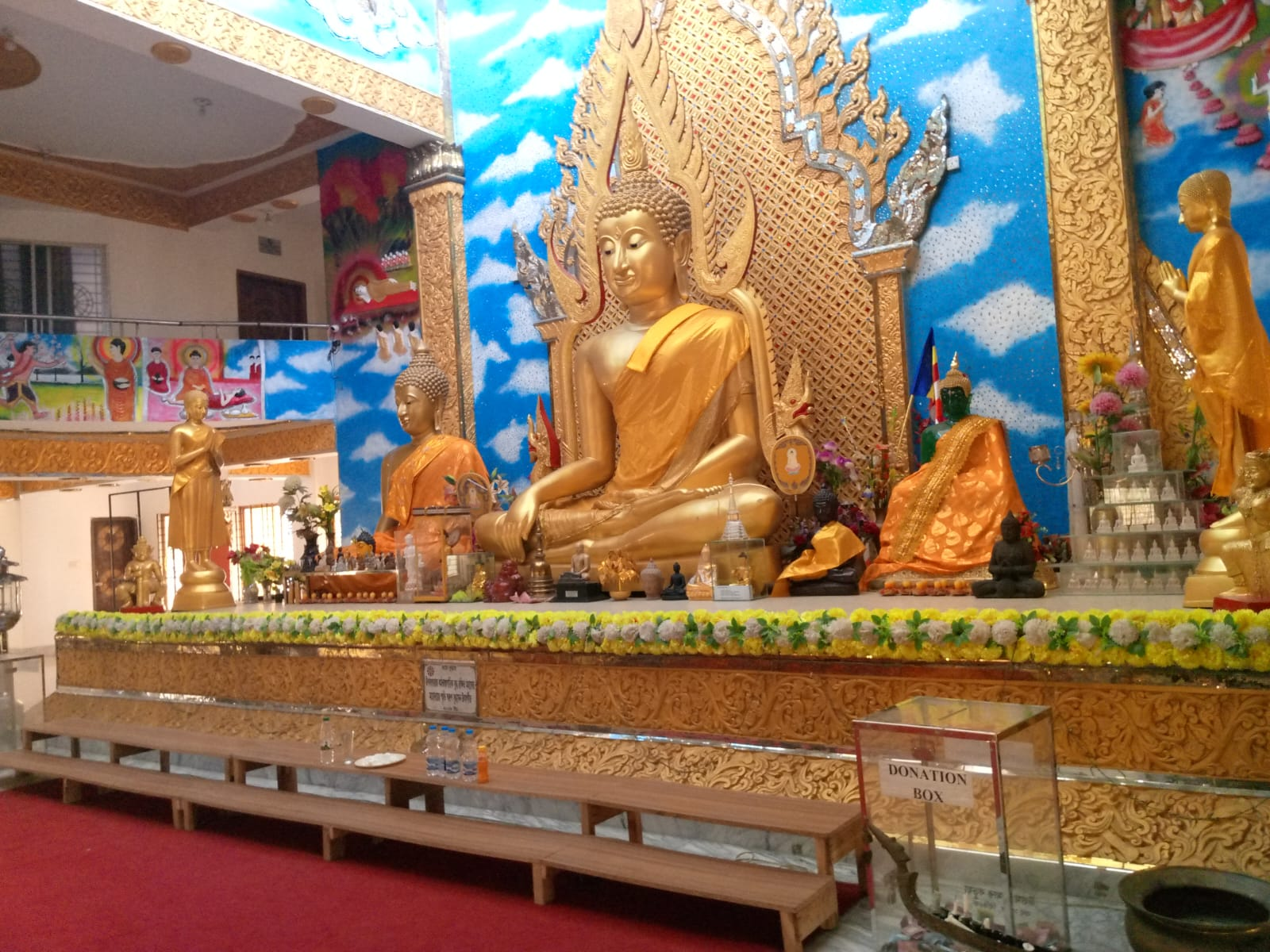

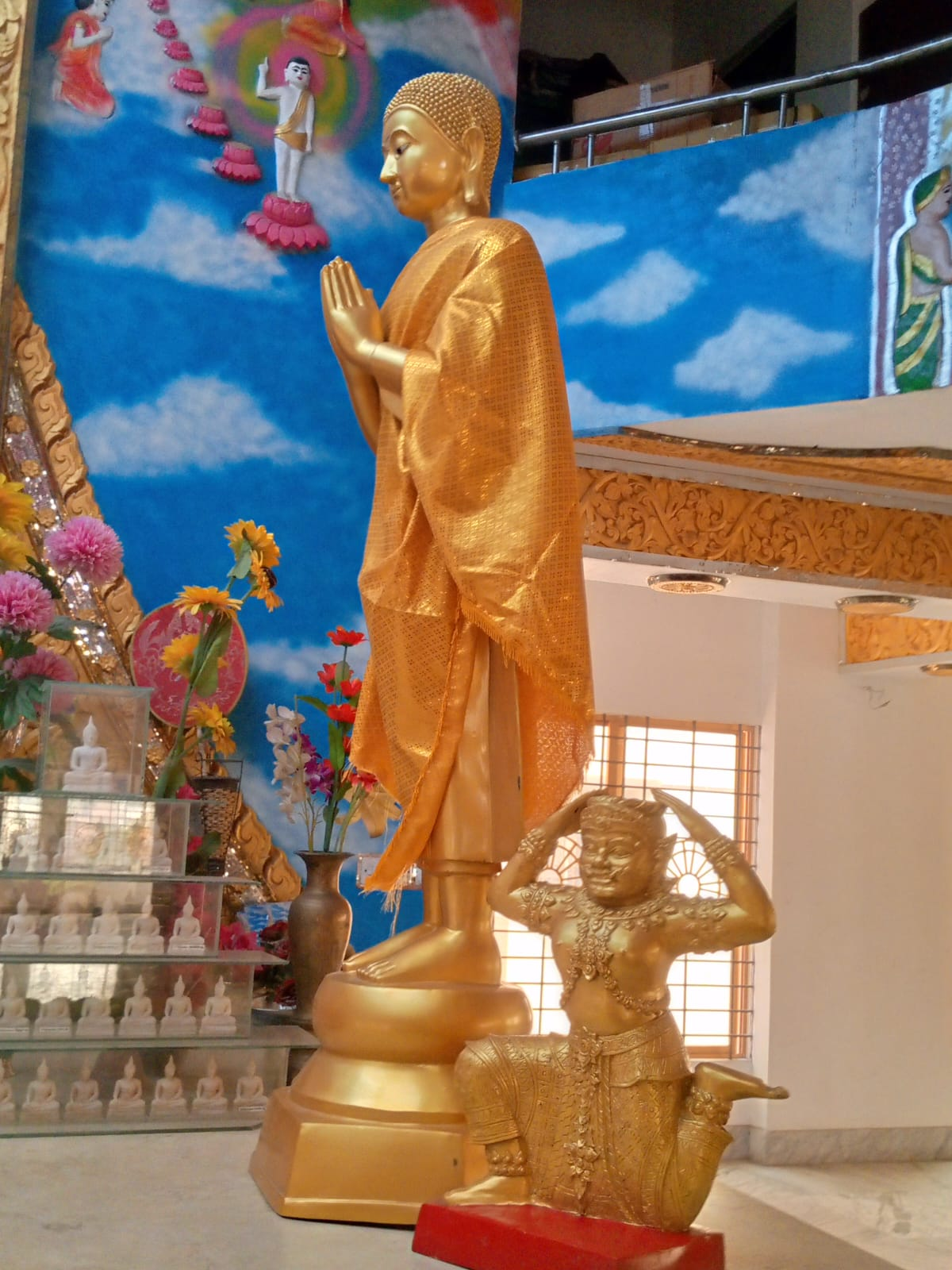

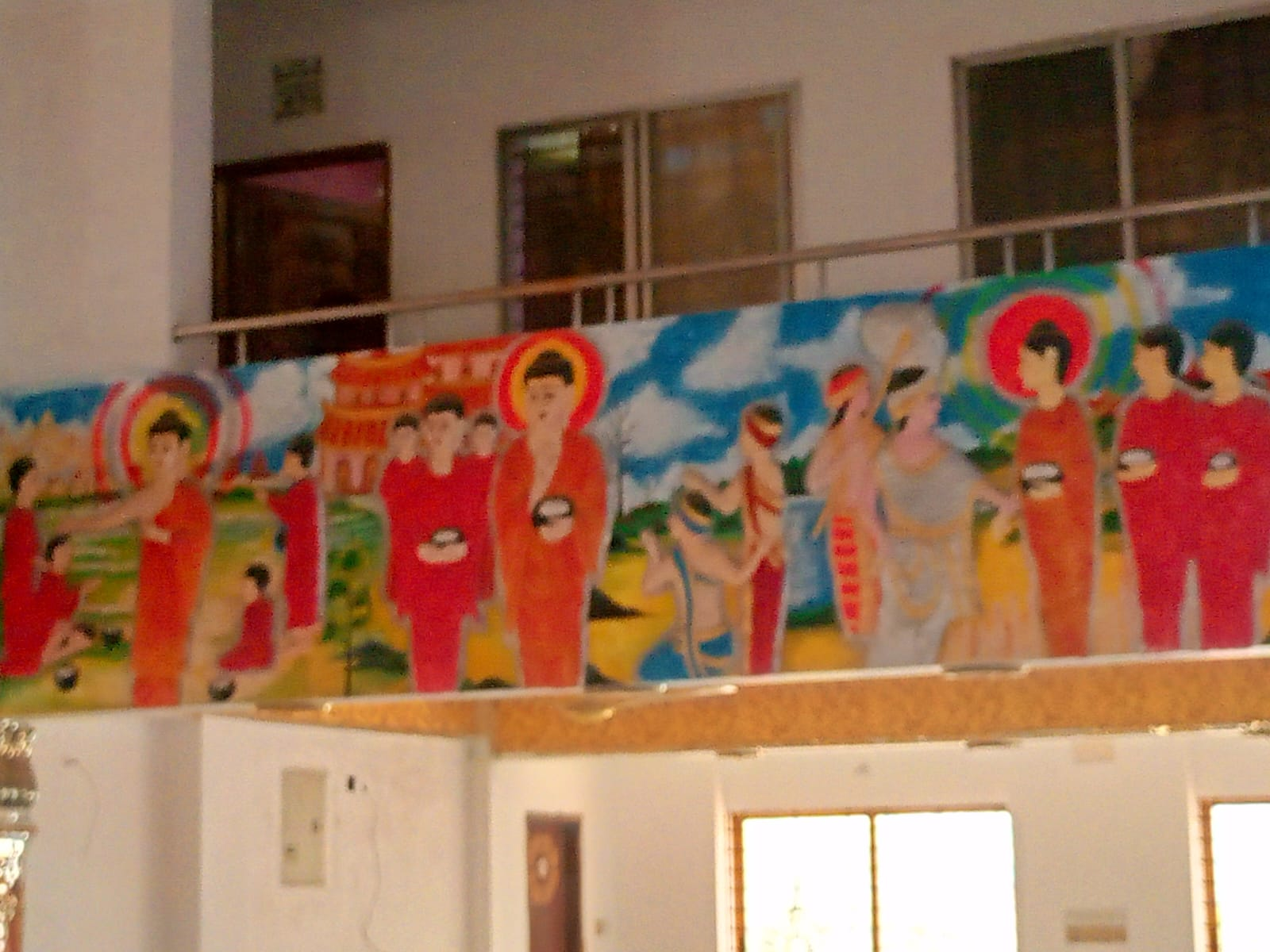

== See also ==
- List of Buddhist temples in Bangladesh
