= Ramkot Banashram =

Buddhist temple in Ramu, Cox Bazar

- রাংকূট বনাশ্রম
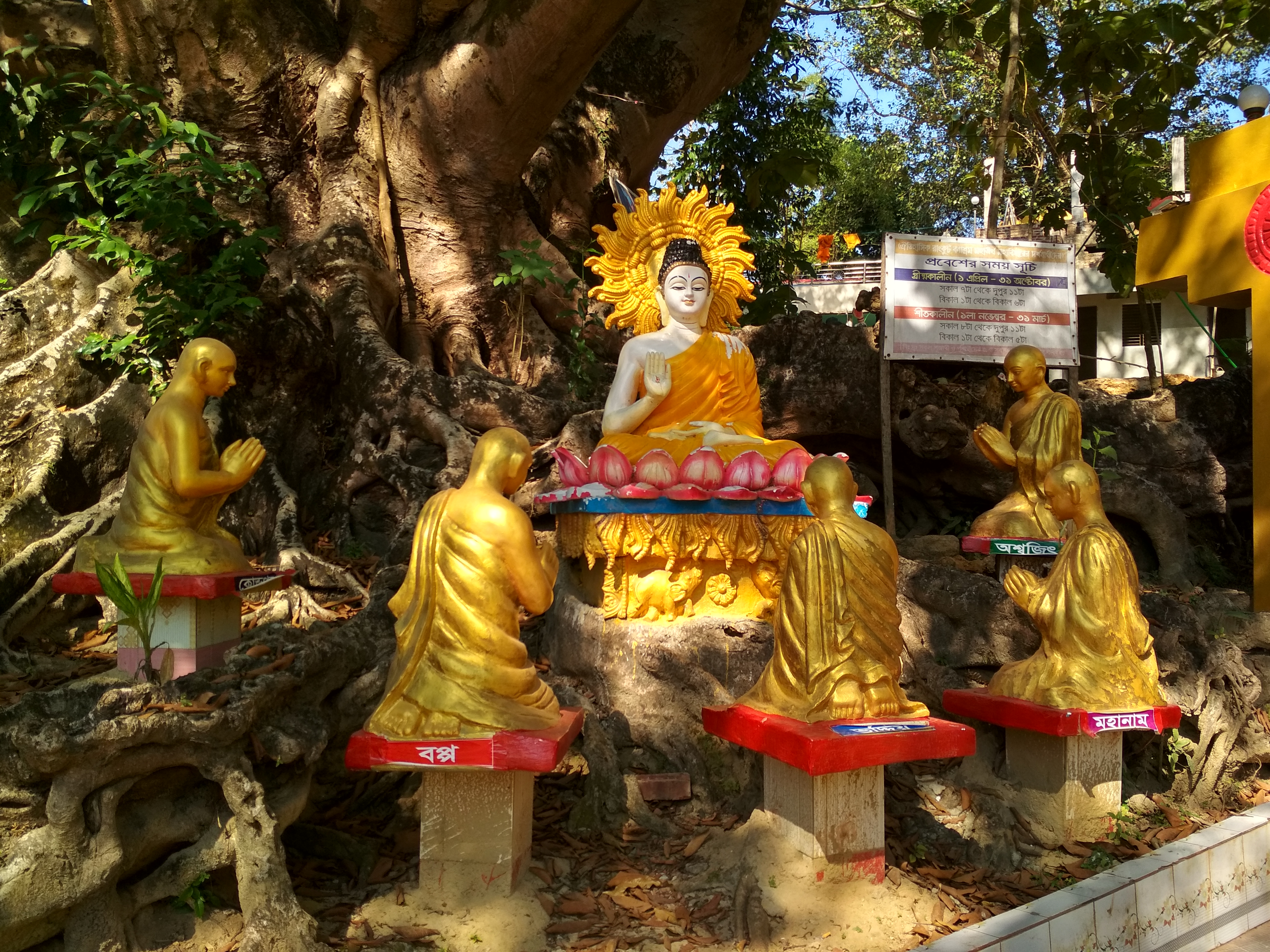

- Location within Bangladesh

Religion
- Affiliation: Buddhism
- Region: Chittagong
- Status: Active

Location
- Location: Rajarkul, Ramu Upazila, Cox's Bazar District
- Country: Bangladesh
- Interactive map of Ramkot Banashram
- Coordinates: 21°24′7.81″N 92°06′37.56″E

Architecture
- Founder: Emperor Ashoka
- Established: 268 BCE

Ramkot Banashram Temple (also known as Rangkut Banashram or Rangkut Monastery) is a historic Buddhist monastery located in Ramu Upazila of Cox's Bazar District, Bangladesh. It is known to be the oldest Buddhist monastery in the country.

== Etymology ==
The name "Rangkut" is derived from the mix of Sanskrit and Rakhine words "rang" (chest bone) and "kut" (hilltop) which reflects the belief that the monastery houses a relic from Buddha's chest. During that time, it is believed that Sanskrit and Rakhine were the dominant language in the region.

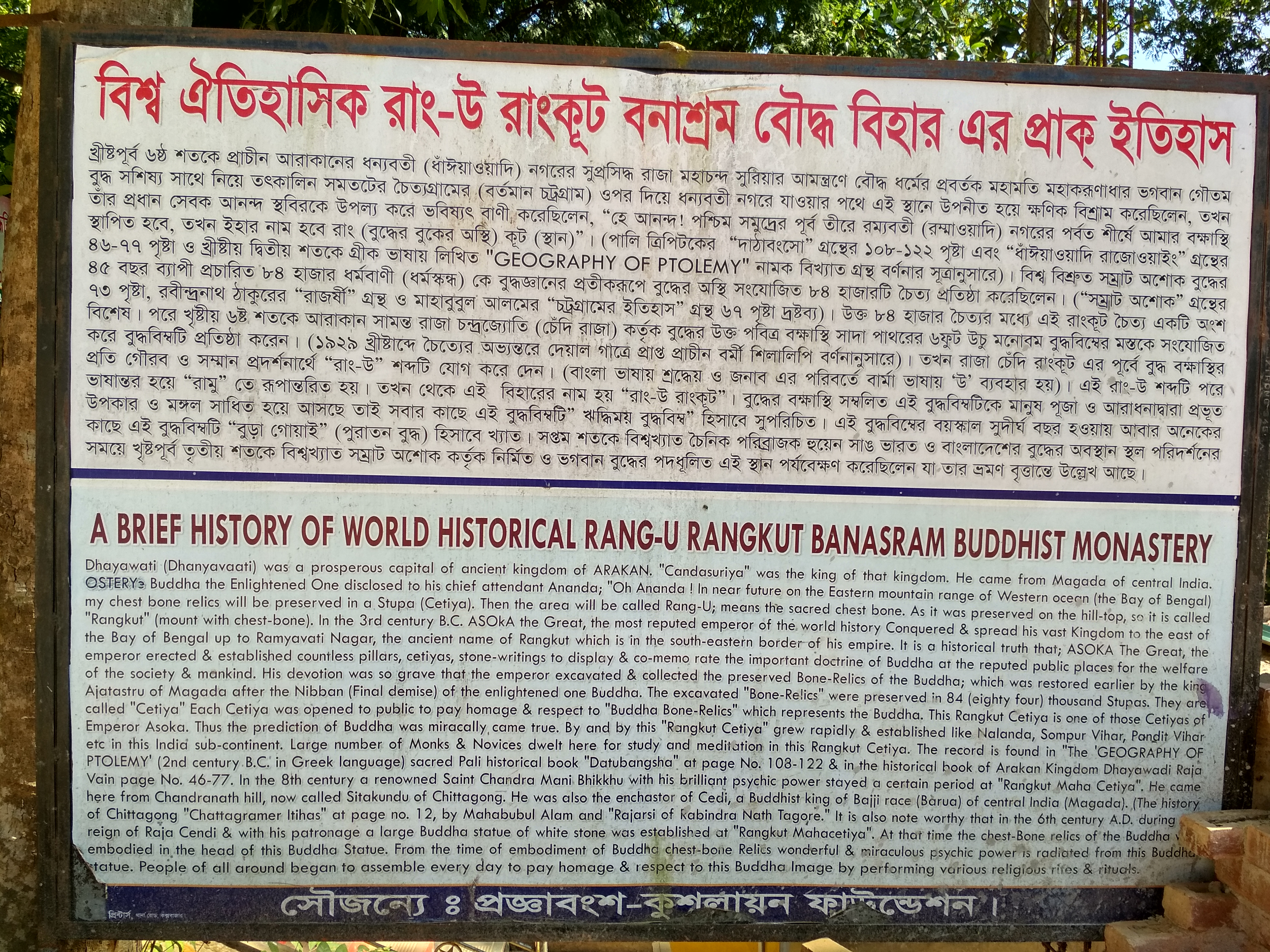
History about the temple

== History ==
The origins of Ramkot Banashram Temple trace back to the 3rd century BCE during the reign of Emperor Ashoka, the third Mauryan Emperor of Magadha. Following his conversion to Buddhism, Ashoka initiated the construction of 84,000 stupas across the Indian subcontinent to disseminate the teachings of Buddha. Ramkot Banashram is believed to be one of these stupas, established to enshrine a relic of Buddha as due to the presence of a piece of his chest bone which fulfills a prophecy made by Buddha during his visit to the region.

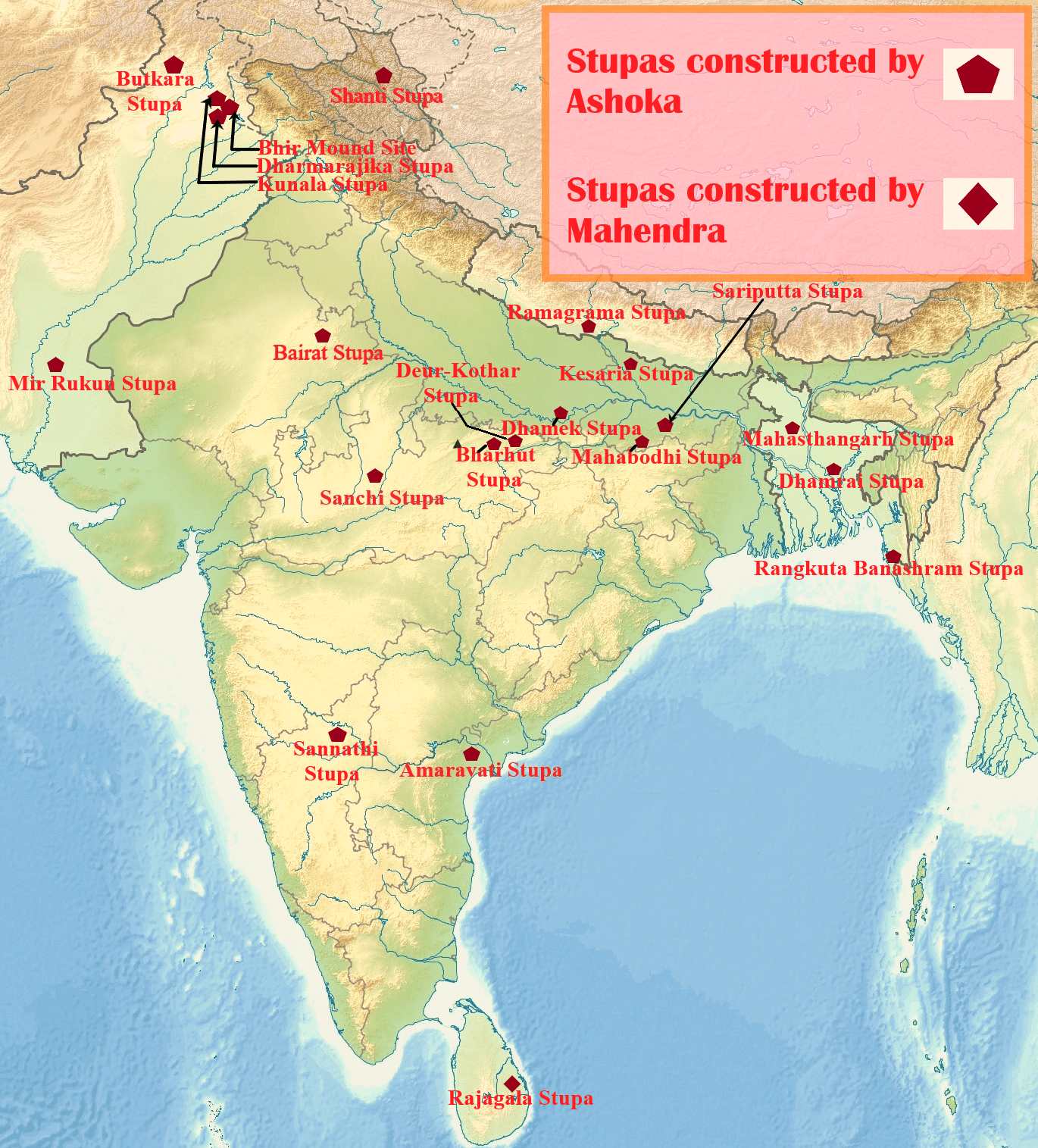
Stupas constructed by Emperor Ashoka

According to local legend, around 600 BCE, Gautama Buddha, accompanied by his disciple Ananda Bhikkhu, visited the hill where the monastery now stands. Buddha is said to have rested there for a night and foretold that a pagoda would be built on the site to house a relic from his chest.

Over various historical texts, the area of Ramu is described as "Pang-wa/Pano-wa", meaning "land of yellow flowers." Ramu once held the status of a provincial capital in Arakan. The ruler of Ramu was referred to by the Rakhine kings. According to legend, during the reign of the first Rakhine king Chenda Thuriya (580-528 BCE) in the Third Dhanyawadi era, Gautama Buddha, along with his disciple Ananda and 500 other disciples, visited Arakan at the king's invitation. During a religious conference, Buddha addressed his chief disciple Ananda, saying:

"O Ananda! In the future, on the mountain peak of the eastern shore of the western sea, my relics will be enshrined. This place will be called ‘Rang-oo’."

The word ‘Rang-oo’ in the Rakhine language means to "chest bone." ‘Rang’ means chest, and ‘oo’ means chest bone. Linguistically, ‘Ramu’ and ‘Rang-oo’ share similarities in both sound and meaning. One of the 84,000 stupas erected by Emperor Ashoka (273-232 BCE) contained the relics from Ramu. The historic Ramkoot Buddhist Monastery was established around 308 BCE on a hilltop in Ramu's Rajarkul Union.

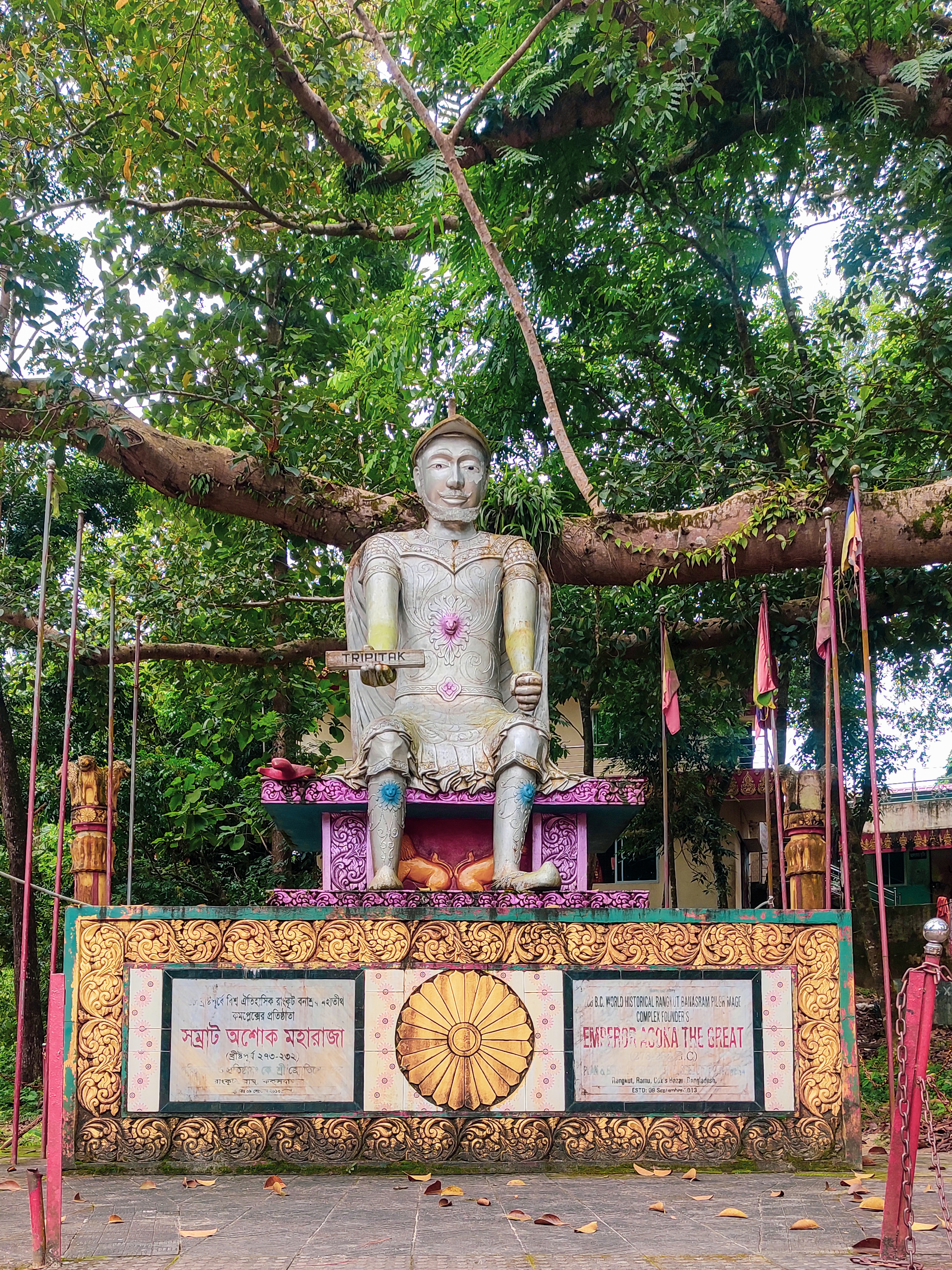
Statue of Emperor Ashoka in the monastery

In the 7th century CE, the Chinese Buddhist monk and traveler Xuanzang (also known as Hiuen Tsang) is believed to have visited the site during his pilgrimage. A large banyan tree near the entrance of the monastery is traditionally associated with Xuanzang and is estimated to be around 1,400 years old.

Over time, the existence of Ramkoot was ignored, but in 1919, Jagat Jyoti Mahasthavir, a monk from Sri Lanka, restored the Ramkoot Buddhist Monastery.

In 1930, Burmese monk Jagatchandra Mahathero discovered a stone inscription in Sri Lanka referencing the monastery. This led to the rediscovery and subsequent restoration of Ramkot Banashram, reaffirming its historical and religious significance.

The monastery features a forest hermitage containing ancient Buddhist structures and artifacts. Every year, numerous pilgrims, devotees, and tourists visit the site. At the base of the hermitage is a Buddhist orphanage named "Jagat Jyoti Shishu Sadan", which is supported by well-wishers from countries like Brazil, France, and Italy. The construction of this orphanage involved the destruction of the memorial stones of the descendants of the Poeza (Khijari Dalal), a benefactor of the Rakhine community. This has left a sense of regret among the locals.

== Architecture ==
The present-day monastery occupies a rectangular area measuring 34 feet by 19 feet and is constructed with bricks of dimensions 9" x 7.7" x 7.2". The structure features a dome rising to a height of 40 feet. During excavations, an image of Buddha in the abhayamudra (gesture of fearlessness) was unearthed and is now enshrined within the monastery, accessible to devotees.

Adjacent to the monastery are the ruins of a large building and remnants of sandstone sculptures, including footprints and handprints attributed to Buddha. These archaeological findings suggest the site's historical use as a sangharama (monastic complex).

The monastery holds statue of various figures such as Emperor Ashoka, B. R. Ambedkar and Xuanzang.

== Location ==
It is situated approximately 12 kilometers from Cox's Bazar town, the monastery is nestled atop a hillock surrounded by 17 small and large hills, offering a serene environment conducive to meditation and spiritual practice.

== Gallery ==
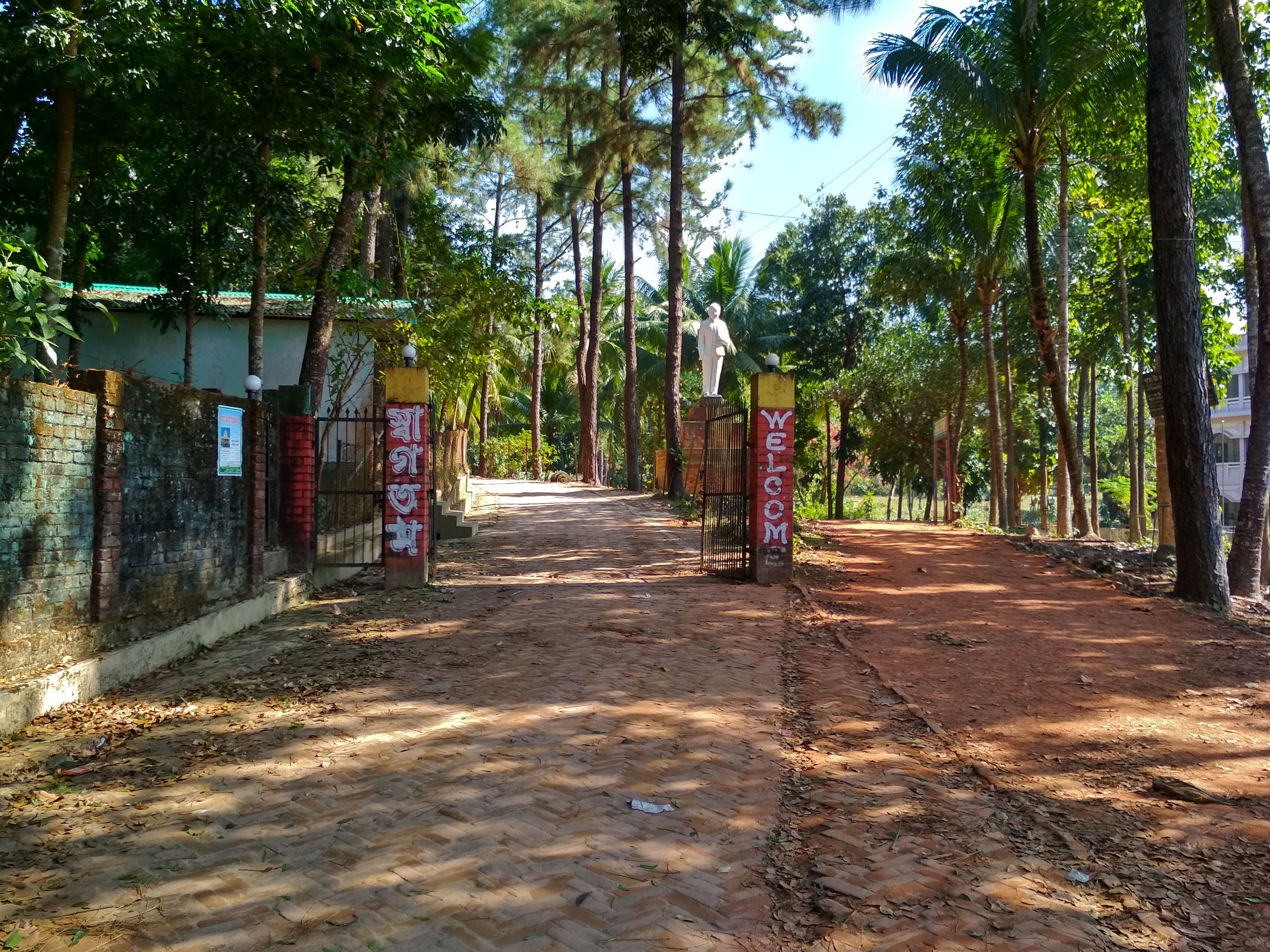
Entry path to the monastery

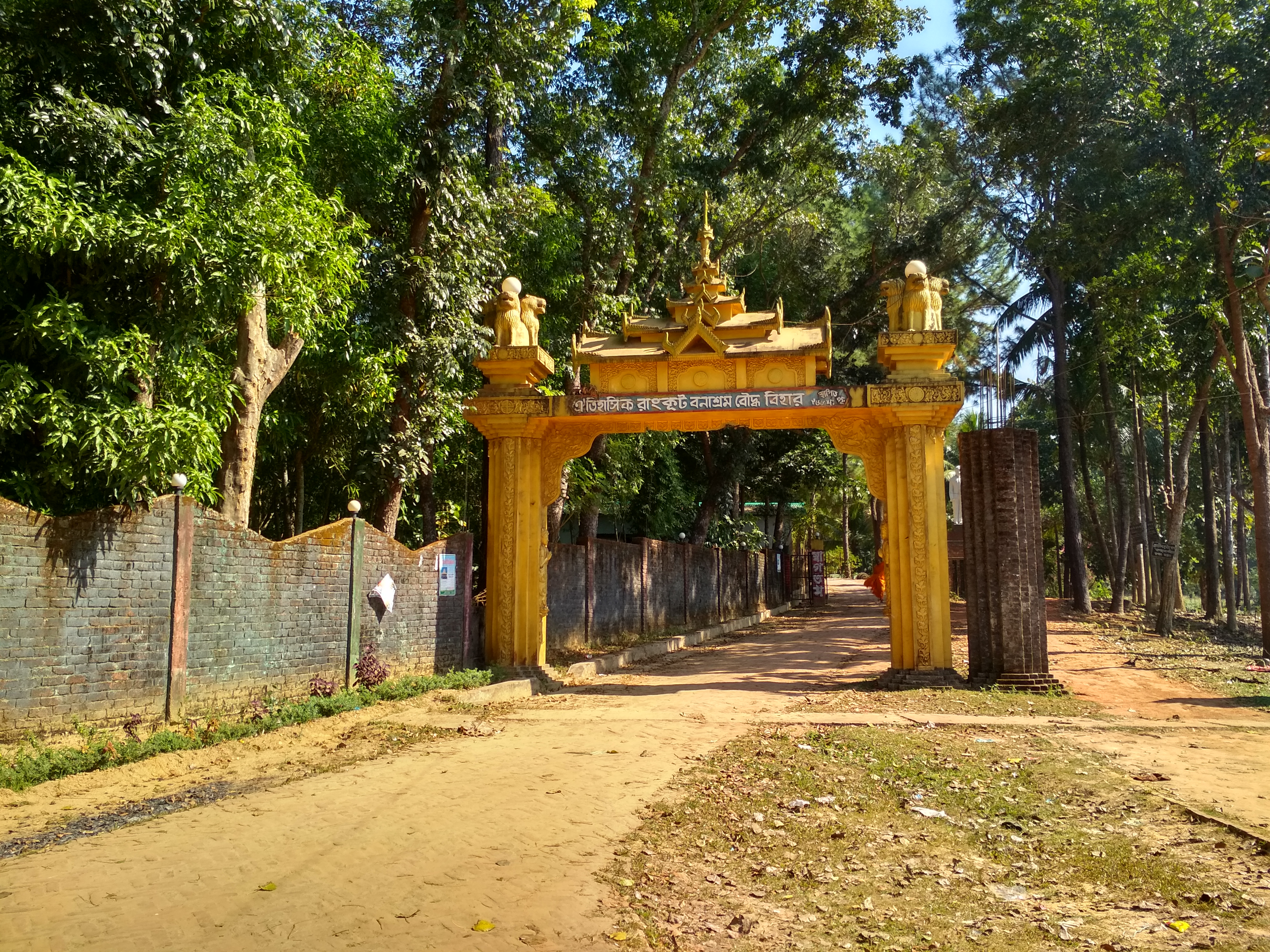
Entry gate to the monastery

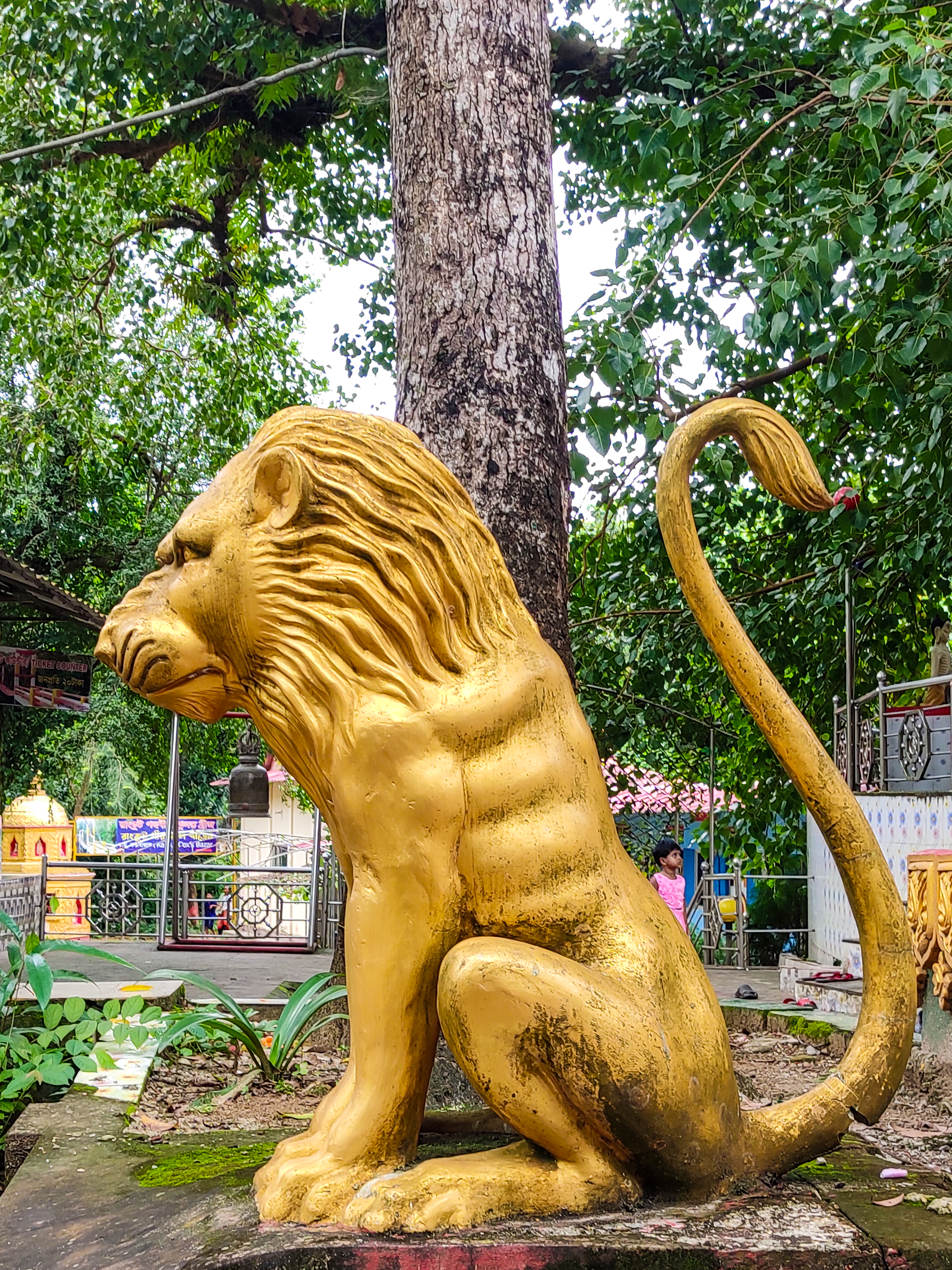
Statue of Lion

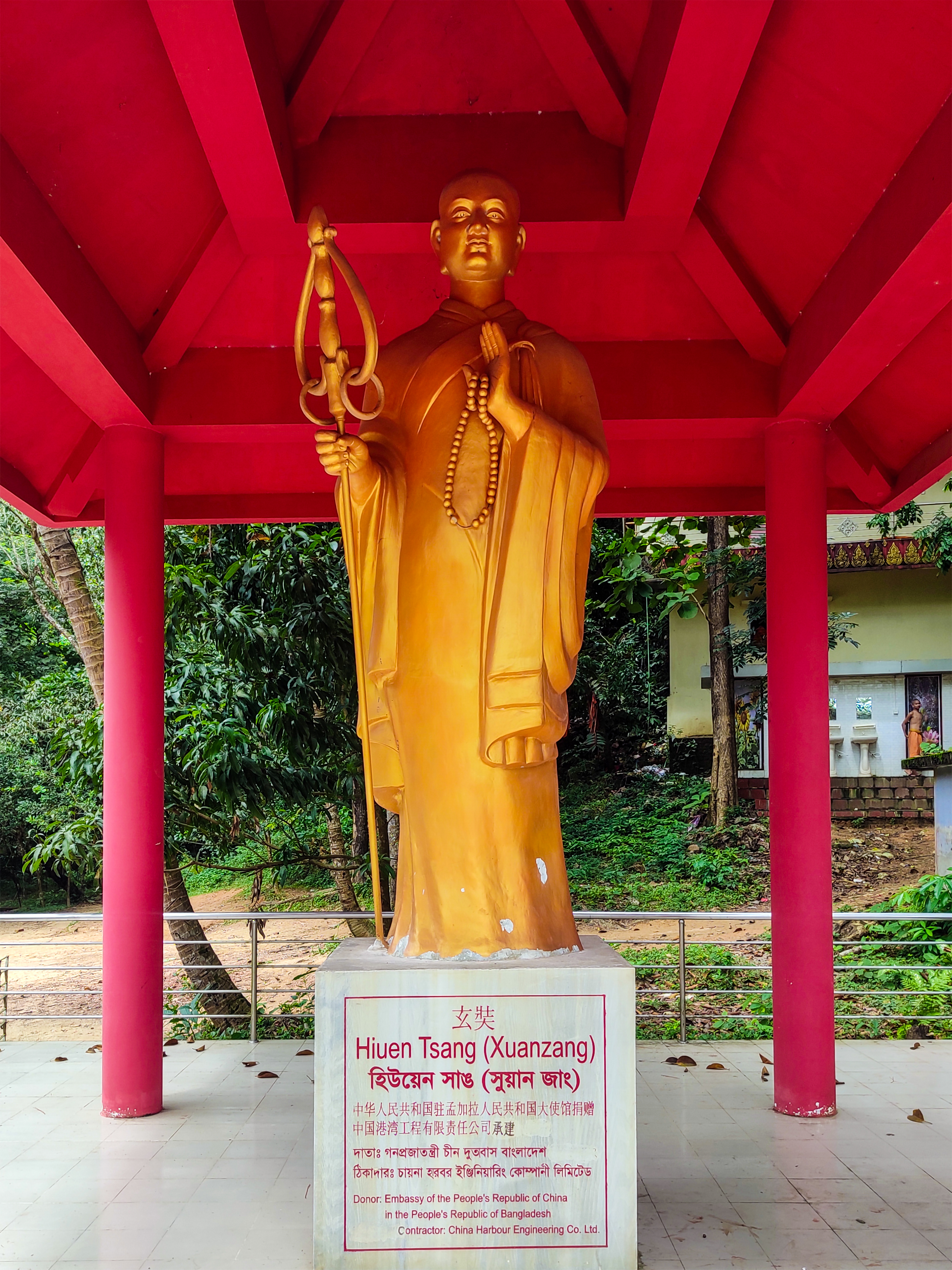
Statue of Chinese traveler Xuanzang

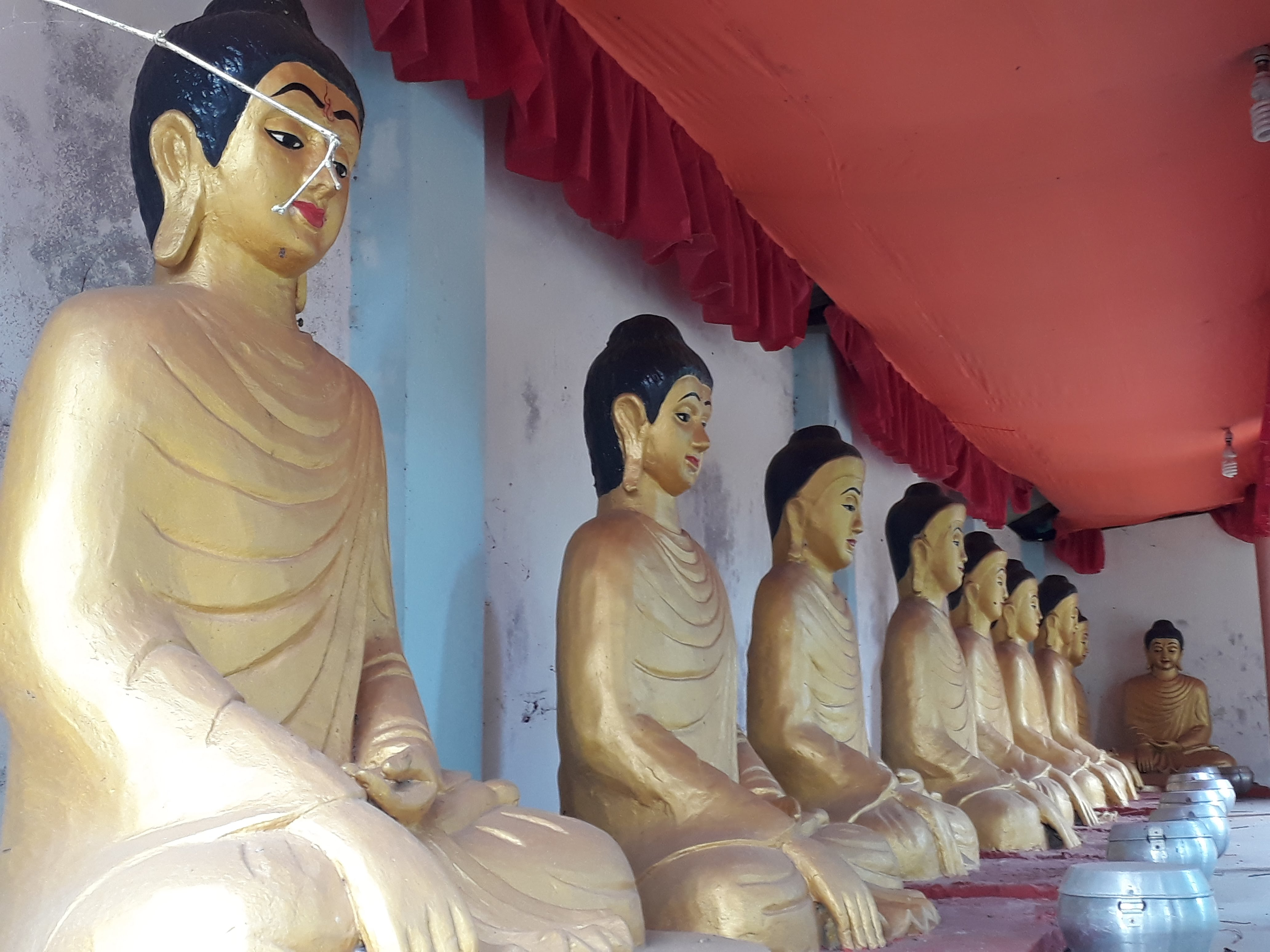
Ramkot Buddha statues

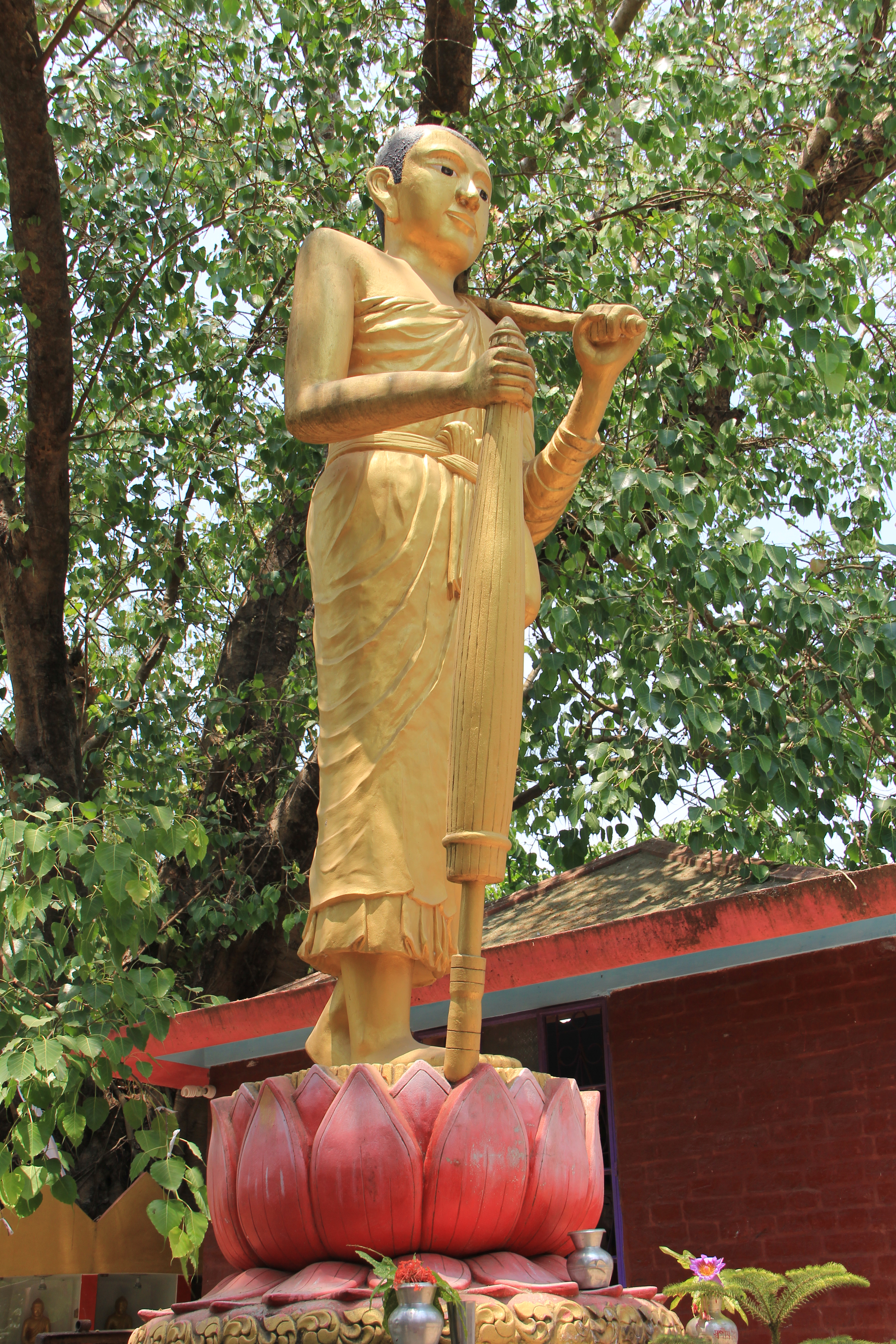
Statue of Buddha

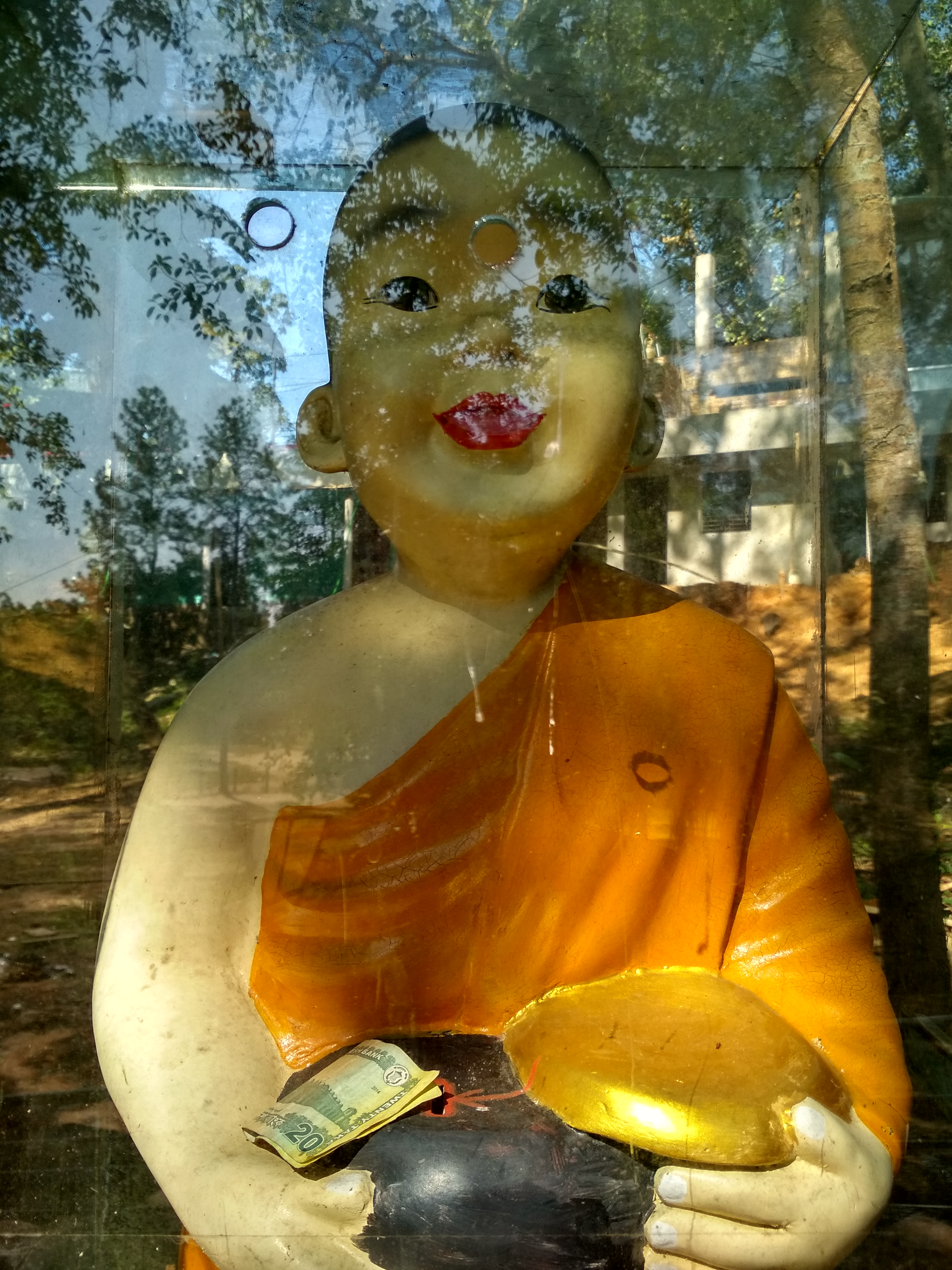
Statue of Buddha

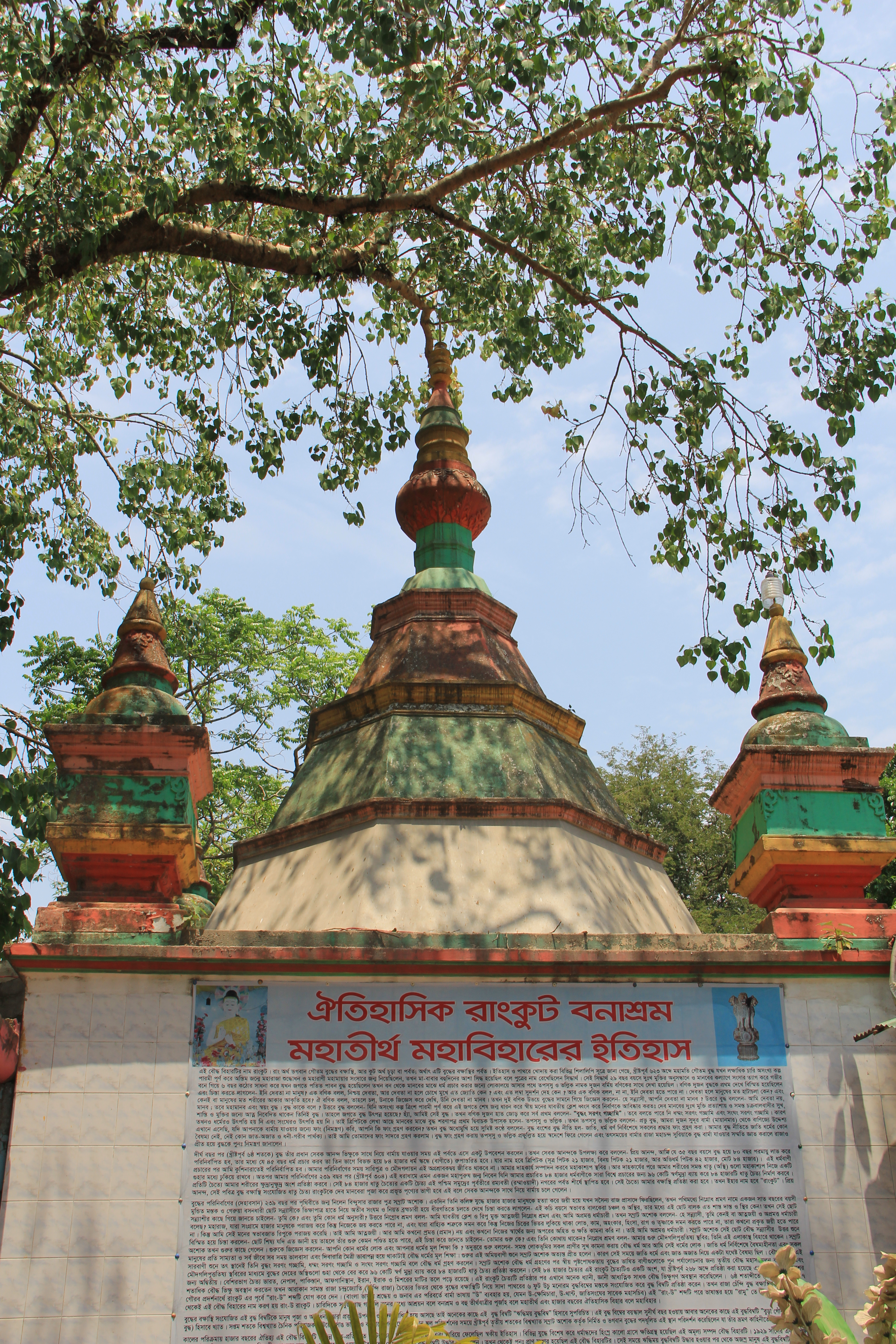
View of the temple

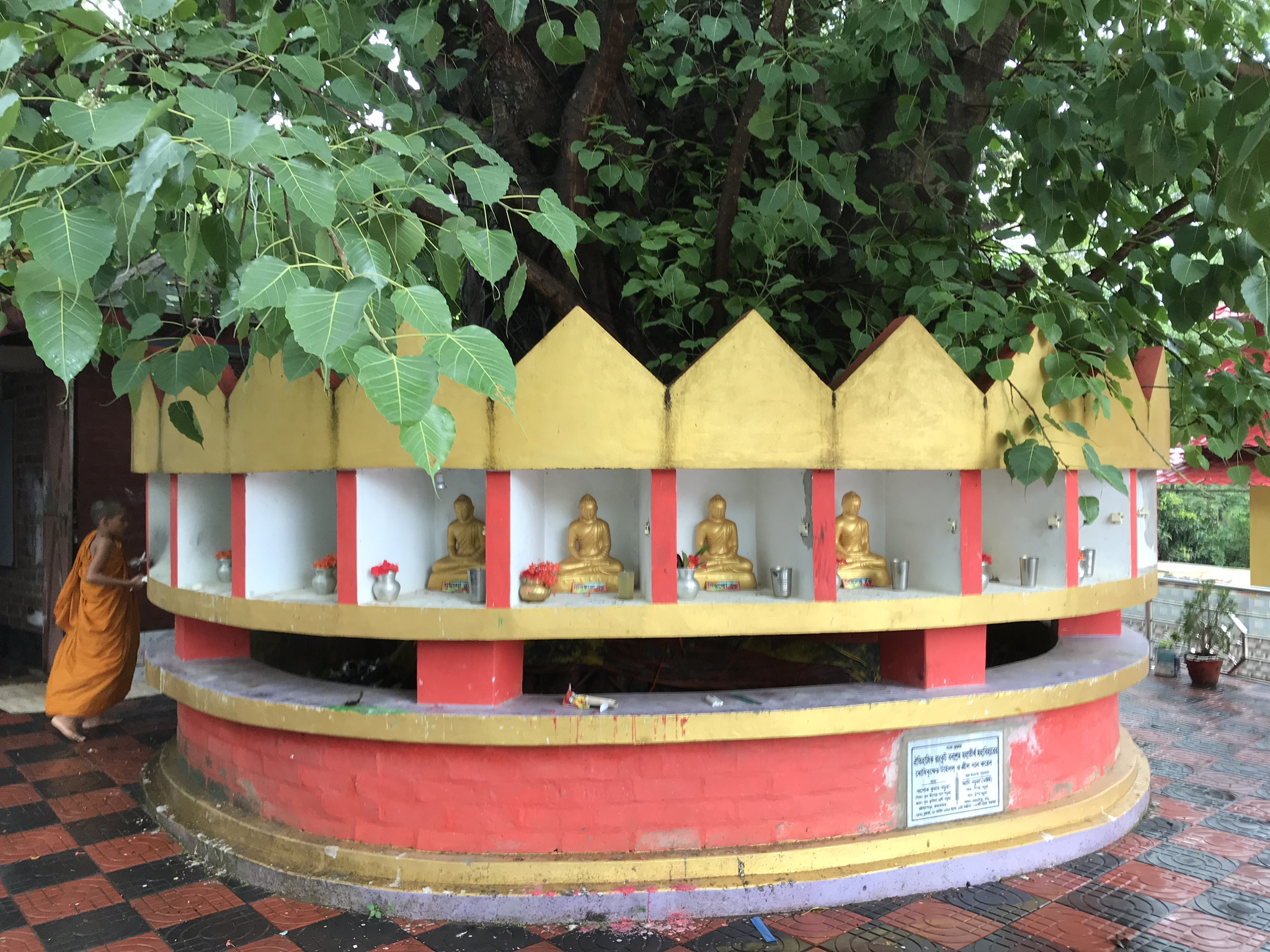
Statues of Buddha

== See also ==
- List of Buddhist temples in Bangladesh
- Pillars of Ashoka
