= Sukomal Barua =

Bangladeshi educationist

- সুকোমল বড়ুয়া
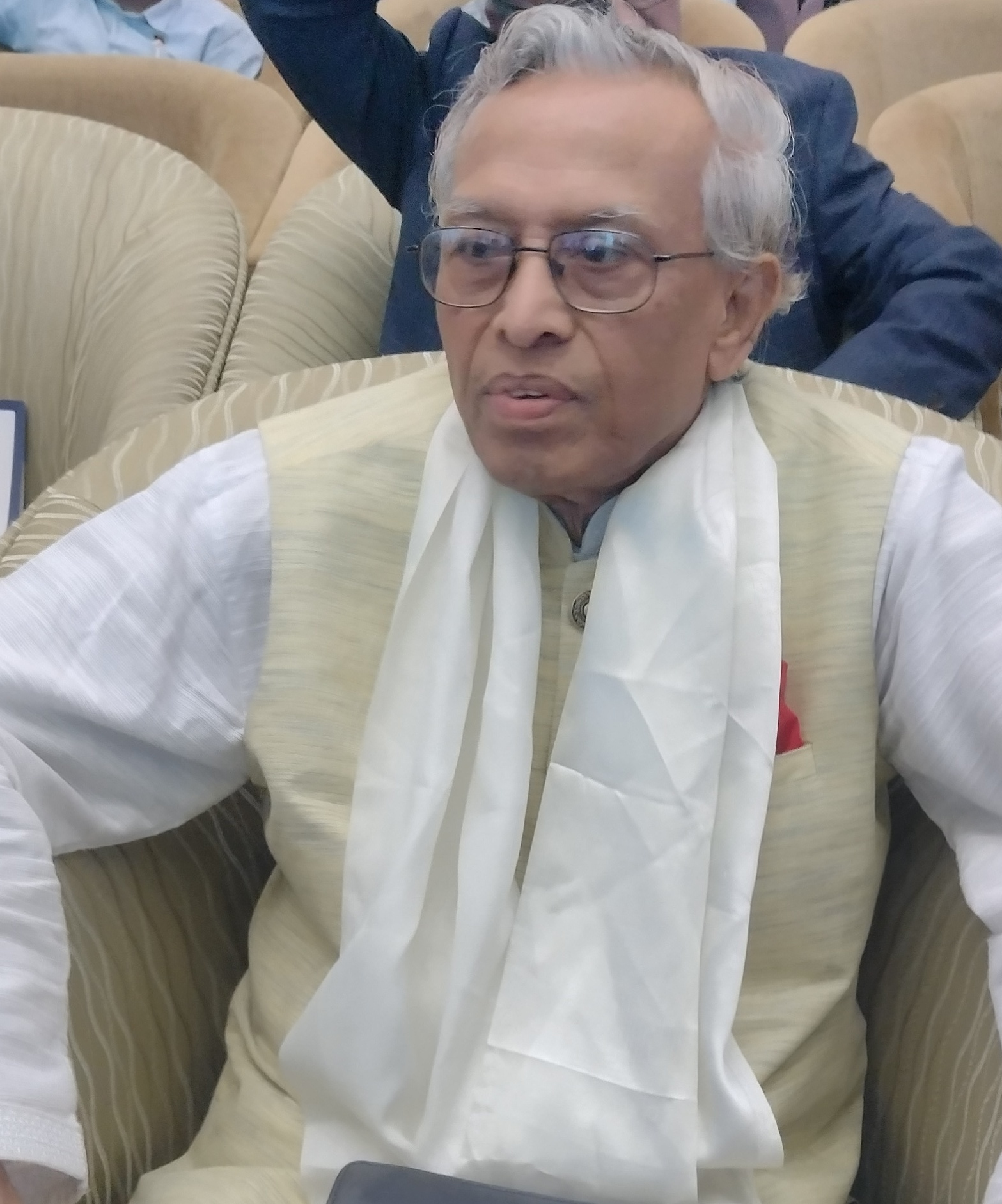
- Barua in 2025
- Born: 1 January 1952; Satkania, Chittagong District, East Pakistan, Pakistan
- Other name: Sundarananda Bhikkhu
- Education: University of Chittagong
- Occupation: Educationist
- Employer: University of Dhaka
- Awards: Ekushey Padak (2006); Independence Award (2026)

Sukomal Barua (born 1 January 1952) is a Bangladeshi educationist. He is a supernumerary professor in the Department of Pali and Buddhist Studies at the University of Dhaka. He is a member of advisory council of the Chairperson of the Bangladesh Nationalist Party since 2016.

== Early life and career ==
Barua was born on 1 January 1952 in Dhemsha Union, Satkania Upazila, Chittagong District to Ganash Chandra Barua and Buddhimati Barua. He completed his master’s degree from the University of Chittagong and earned a PhD degree from Banaras Hindu University. Barua first worked at Rangunia College as a lecturer. Later he worked at Hasina Jamal Degree College where he was the first principal. He then joined the University of Dhaka as a professor of the Department of Pali and Buddhist Studies. He became chairman of Department of Pali and Buddhist Studies in University of Dhaka. He is an adjunct professor of Atish Dipankar University of Science and Technology.

Barua served as the secretary general of "Religions for Peace Bangladesh". He was in central committee of the organization named "Asian Conference of Religions for Peace". He was first principal of Dhaka International Buddhist Monastery. He served as the president of the Gurudwara Management Committee Bangladesh and Dr. Ambedkar Foundation. He was vice-president of the Bangladesh Interreligious Writers and Journalists Association, and the Bangladesh chapter of the Asian Buddhist Conference for Peace.

He is President of the Bangladesh Chapter of World Buddhist Federation and Chairman of Council for Interfaith Hermony in Bangladesh.

== Personal life and legacy ==
Barua has a daughter, Sanghamitra Barua Manosi. Barua has been awarded the prestigious Ekushey Padak in 2006 by the government of Bangladesh for his contribution to education. Manosi introduced Sukomal Barua Gold Medal at the University of Dhaka. She formed a trust fund of ৳4,00,000 in 2014. The money is given to the students of Pali and Buddhist Studies from Dhaka University who are awarded gold medals annually. In 2017, the size of this fund stood at ৳1 million. He received the Independence Award in 2026 for his special contributions to research and training.

== Works ==
- পালিভাষা সাহিত্য: ছন্দ ও অলঙ্কার [Pali language literature: rhyme and rhetoric] (in Bengali). Bangla Academy.
- পালি সাহিত্যে ধষ্মপদ [Dhashmapada in Pali literature] (in Bengali). Bangla Academy.
- কোসল ও মার সংযুক্ত [Kosal and Mar connected] (in Bengali). Bangla Academy.
