= Ramu Upazila =

Ramu রামু
- Upazila
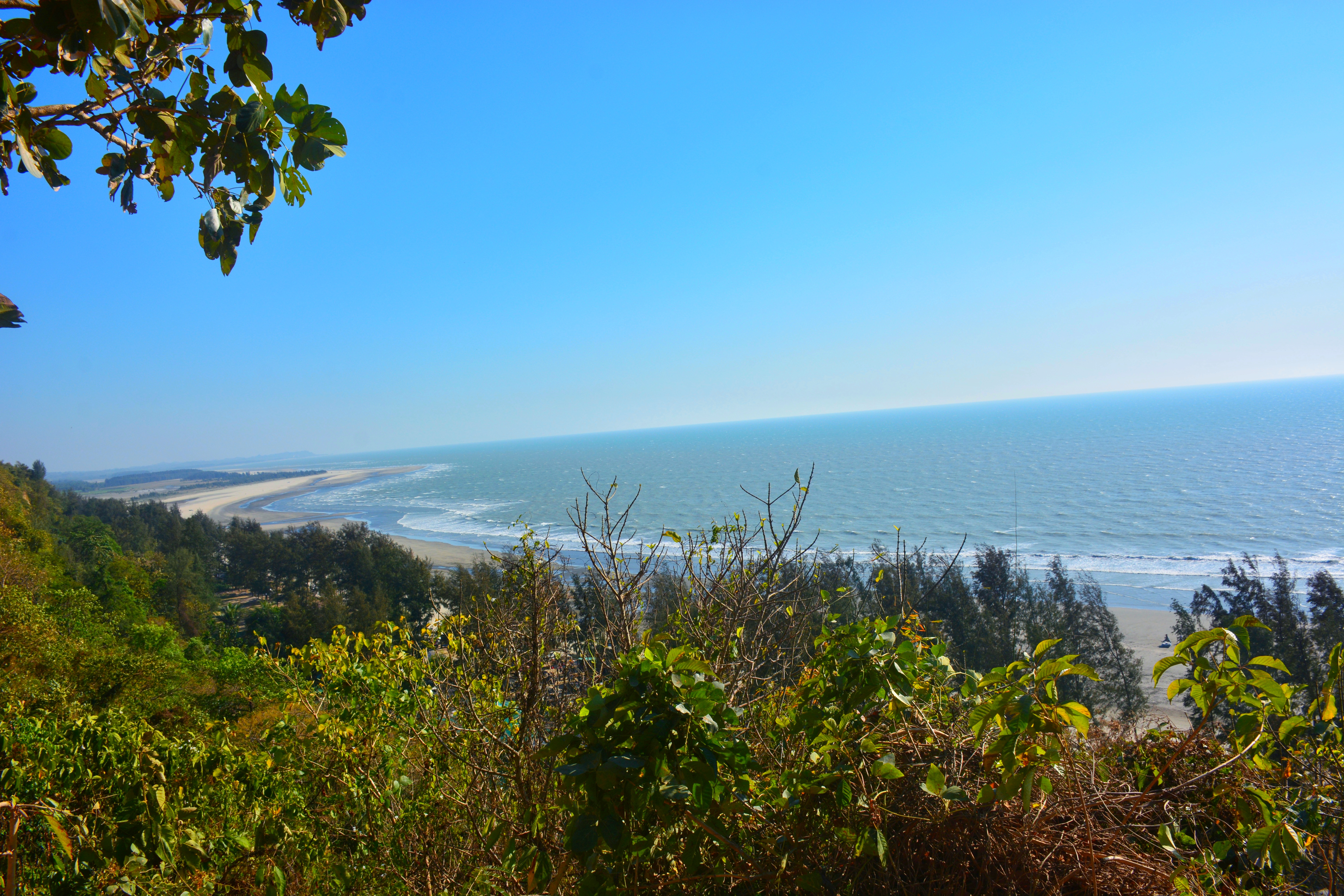
- Beach in Himchari National Park

- Coordinates: 21°27.5′N 92°6′E
- Country: Bangladesh
- Division: Chittagong
- District: Cox's Bazar

Area
  - Total: 391.71 km^{2} (151.24 sq mi)

Population (2022)
  - Total: 344,545
  - Density: 879.59/km^{2} (2,278.1/sq mi)
- Time zone: UTC+6 (BST)
- Postal code: 4730
- Area code: 03425
- Website: ramu.coxsbazar.gov.bd

Ramu (Bengali: রামু) is an upazila of Cox's Bazar District in the Division of Chittagong, Bangladesh.

== History ==
The area was called Rammabhumi and had various names over time, including Rangu, Ruhmi, Raahmi, Rameu, and Pamoa. Tibetan historian Lama Taranath noted Chittagong (Chattagram) was known as Rammabhumi during the Pala period. The Tripura history Rajmala and the Alamgirnama also mention names like Ramvu/Rambhu for Ramu.

Ramu and surrounding regions were once under Arakanese rule. According to local Rakhains, Dhanyawadi kings ruled from 3325 BC to 300 AD.

Fa Hien, a Chinese monk, traveled here through India (399–414 AD) collecting Buddhist texts and witnessing Buddhist practices.

A Buddha temple stands in Ramu today. It is believed Emperor Ashoka built a stupa there, as part of the 84,000 stupas he constructed worldwide, each with a Dharmachakra.

Islam's arrived in Ramu during the 14th century when Arab Muslim traders and preachers arrived in the region following the Mughal conquest of Chittagong.

During the First Anglo-Burmese War, a significant battle occurred in Ramu where a British detachment faced defeat from Burmese forces of approximately 4,000 troops.

In September 2012, Ramu experienced significant communal violence when several temples and homes were attacked and destroyed following the circulation of a controversial image on social media. The incident drew national and international attention to the region at that time.

== Geography ==
Ramu is located at 21.4583°N 92.1000°E. It has an area of 391.71 km^{2}.

== Demographics ==
Religions in Ramu Upazila (2022)
Religion	Percent
Islam	93.91%
Hinduism	3.09%
Buddhism	2.95%
Other or not stated	0.05%

According to the 2022 Bangladeshi census, Ramu Upazila had 69,120 households and a population of 344,545. 11.83% of the population were under 5 years of age. Ramu had a literacy rate (age 7 and over) of 72.06%: 74.21% for males and 69.72% for females, and a sex ratio of 108.48 males for every 100 females. 107,973 (31.34%) lived in urban areas.

As of the 2011 Census of Bangladesh, Ramu upazila had 47,904 households and a population of 266,640. 78,531 (29.45%) were under 10 years of age. Ramu had an average literacy rate of 36.58%, compared to the national average of 51.8%, and a sex ratio of 975 females per 1000 males. 42,072 (15.78%) of the population lived in urban areas.

As of the 1991 Bangladesh census, Ramu has a population of 167480. Males constitute 51.41% of the population, and females 48.59%. This Upazila's eighteen up population is 74742. Ramu has an average literacy rate among town people is 34%., and the national average of 32.4% literate. Ramu thana was transformed into an upazila in 1983. It consists of 9 union parishads, 39 mouzas and 102 villages.

== Administration ==
Ramu Upazila is divided into 11 union parishads: Chakmarkul, Dakshin Mithachhari, Eidghar, Fotekharkul, Garjoniya, Jouarianala, Kacchapia, Kawarkhop, Khuniapalong, Rajarkul, and Rashidnagar. The union parishads are subdivided into 39 mauzas and 102 villages. the union parishad
