= Battle of Ramu =

- Part of the First Anglo-Burmese War
| Date | 13 to 16 May 1824 |
| Location | Ramu, Cox's Bazar, Bangladesh (then part of the British Empire) 21°27.5′N 92°6′E |
| Result | Burmese victory |

Belligerents
| (Konbaung dynasty) Burmese Empire | British Empire |

Commanders and leaders
| (Konbaung dynasty) Maha Thiha Thura, U Sa | (United Kingdom of Great Britain and Ireland) Captain Thomas Noton † |

Strength
| 1,000–2,000 infantry (engaged); 200 cavalry Total: 2,000 | 350 Bengal Army Regulars; 250 Provincials; 400 Arakanese Levies; 2 Six-pounder guns Total: 1,000 |

Casualties and losses
| Less than 200 killed or wounded | 6 officers killed and 2 wounded 250 killed, wounded or captured Entire force disintegrated |

The Battle of Ramu, also known in Burmese as ပန်းဝါတိုက်ပွဲ fought in May 1824, was one of the major opening battles of the First Anglo-Burmese War. On May 10, 1824, the Burmese under General Maha Bandula launched an invasion of Chittagong from Arakan as the southern part of a two-pronged attack aimed at Calcutta. They offered to end the invasion if the British were to hand over some Arakanese rebels that had taken refuge in the Bengal Presidency. The British commander at Ramu, Captain Noton (also spelled Cotton in some sources), rejected the offer, and the Burmese detachment under Maha Thiha Thura, the future Lord Myawaddy Mingyi U Sa attacked. After three days of fighting the British troops, a mixed force with a total strength of several hundred men, was routed and forced from Ramu on May 17. The British losses in killing, wounding, and missing amounted to more than half the strength of the garrison. The Burmese however failed to exploit their advantage, and Maha Bandula's army would withdraw to counter the British occupation of Rangoon.

== Campaign background ==
In 1824, the Burmese armies marched into the Bengal Presidency to force the British into surrendering Arakanese rebels taking shelter. Maha Bandula, was supported by twelve of the Burmese best divisions, including one under his personal command, all totaling 10,000 men and 500 horses. Bandula's plan was to attack the British on two fronts: Chittagong from Arakan in the southeast, and Sylhet from Cachar and Jaintia in the north. Bandula personally commanded the Arakan theatre while Thado Thiri Maha Uzana commanded Cachar and Jaintia theater.

British forces in Chittagong under Colonel Shapland consists of around 3,000 men from 13th Bengal Native infantry, 5 companies of the 2nd battalion 20th Native infantry, 1st battalion of the 23rd Native Infantry and a local corps of Arakanese levies.

Early in the war, British forces were pushed back by the battle-hardened Burmese due to the difficulties of fighting in the jungles of Manipur and Assam.

While Bandula remained in Arakan, a 4,000 strong Burmese force under Maha Thiha Thura U Sa, advanced into Chittagong. According to G.P. Ramachandra, the Burmese made several efforts to make peaceful contact.

According to a British witness:

"Captain Noton [the British commander] communicated with two horsemen who approached the opposite bank of the river, who disavowed any hostile intention of the Burmese towards us, but desired only that some rebellious subjects under our protection should be delivered up to them offering at the same time to explain further the views of the Burmese, provided Captain Noton would allow them to cross the river with a guard of 100 horsemen and guarantee the safety of that party."

Noton did not trust the Burmese and rejected the offer. It appears that the British were the first to open fire:

"On the evening of the 14th, the enemy's whole force is concentrated on the opposite bank of the river apparently with the intention of crossing at a favourable opportunity [some units] were detached for the purpose of annoying the enemy on their Encampment, and preventing them crossing the river, should they attempt it. Several rounds of grape and shrapnel were fired from the nine-pounders with effect, and appeared to create much confusion."

The Burmese then proceeded to attack the British force occupying Ratnapallang, fourteen miles south of Ramu. Captain Noton, commanding from Ramu, decided to attack the Burmese position, leaving the convalescents of the 1/23rd, the whole of the Provincials, and around a hundred levy, he marched out of Ramu on the evening of 11 May with the rest of his detachment, including the two 6-pounder guns.

The British found the Burmese occupying the hills overlooking the road on the east side and built a stockade at Ratnapallang. While Captain Noton was able to advance past these hills towards the stockade, they experienced difficulty in bringing up the guns due to the inexperience of the mahouts who drove the elephants.

The British exchanged fire all night around the stockade but were forced to withdraw in the morning due to the ammunition coolies deserting and the guns thus being unserviceable. Noton withdrew to back to Ramu, with a loss of seven missing and eleven wounded. He was reinforced joined by three companies of the 2nd battalion of the 20th Bengal Native Infantry.

== Forces ==
The British forces consisted of around 350 regulars: five companies from the 1st Battalion of the 23rd Bengal Native Infantry, three companies from the 2nd Battalion, 20th Bengal Native Infantry, 250 men from the Chittagong Provincial Battalion and about 400 Maghs (Arakanese) Levies. Noton also had under his command two 6-pounder guns. The Burmese royal chronicles reported that the British had 10,000 men at Ramu, which likely came from the information that the entire British defense force along the entire border being 9,000 made up of three brigades of 3,000 men.

The Burmese army left the capital with 4,000 and gathered levies along the way gathering up to a total of around 10,000 by the time they reach Arakan. The British estimated at least 10,000 infantry and 200 cavalrymen at Ramu, however, actual numbers are likely lower as the Burmese forces split into several columns under Sa, Uzana and Maha Bandula himself. Furthermore, the British regarded much of the intelligence gathered on Burma to be inadequate and unreliable.

== Battle ==
On the 13th morning, Sa's forces had been reinforced and encouraged by their success, advanced from their stockade in Ratnapallang and occupied the hills east of Ramu across the river which flows by the town. Despite the disparity in strength, Noton resolved to hold Ramu, for he was confident that further reinforcements would arrive from Chittagong.

During 14 May, the two 6-pounder guns managed to prevent the Burmese from crossing the river, but on the 15th they managed to cross the stream, and took possession of a tank near British position. The encampment was surrounded by a three-foot levee and was protected on its right flank by the river; some sixty feet right flank was another tank, which was held by a rear was also a tank, held by a strong unit of Provincials. The Burmese infantry made good use of natural cover and despite heavy fire proceeded to occupy the tank in front without difficulties. Arakanese levy leaders warned Norton of Burmese tactics but difficulties in translations and Norton's own mistrust led to the British forces remaining passive. In the next two days, the Burmese steadily exchanged fire with the British and entrenched themselves closer and closer until they all around the British lines. The Arakanese levies and Provincials at this point were greatly demoralized but their attempt to desert to the Burmese was stopped by Norton arresting their ringleaders.

Noton began to consider withdrawing but he had received information that Captain Brandon would be reinforcing him from Chittagong next day, and confident of his regulars' discipline chose to hold his ground. Skirmishing continued all night but by the next morning, the Burmese positions had been reinforced and were entrenched within thirty yards of the British pickets at the tank and began to open fire. The Provincial troops and levies guarding the tank were alarmed and routed as the Burmese infantry charged. When the Burmese captured the tank, the remaining levies fled taking the elephants from the gunnery teams with them.

Under threat to be completely surrounded, Noton ordered his remaining 400 regulars to retreat as Burmese infantry swarmed all around their former positions. According the report by the surviving officers, they "proceeded in tolerable order for about half a mile, keeping up a desultory fire on the enemy, who poured in on us on every side in immense numbers. On the arrival of the enemy's cavalry, who fell upon our rear and cut to pieces numbers of sepoys, the detachment quickened its paces, and the utmost combined exertions of the officers to preserve the ranks, and effect the formation of a square, were unavailing, and each corps and company presently became so intermingled with each other, that all order and discipline became at an end." The Burmese cavalry charge broke all remaining order in the British force with many soldiers and officers cut down by the chasing horsemen.

== Aftermath ==
=== Casualties ===
The British force suffered around 250 killed, wounded or captured. Among the six European and three Indian officers, only three survived with two being wounded. The six officers: Captains William L.Trueman and Robert Pringles, Lieutenant Mark Grigg, Ensign Frederick Bennet, Assistant-surgeon Maysmore and Noton himself were killed. Lieutenants Scott and Campbell were wounded while Lieutenant Codrington escaped. The British force at Ramu had been thoroughly destroyed with British prisoners being marched back to Ava. The British considered their operations in the Chittagong frontier "unsatisfactory throughout" with little knowledge of the terrain, sickness being prevalent, difficulties in logistics and lack of friendly locals.

The Burmese losses were unknown but were suspected to suffer at most 200 killed or wounded most of them from the British artillery. The Burmese commander at Ramu, Sa, however, witnessed the firepower of British regulars and would at that point attempt to avoid engaging them in open combat.

Sa's column then joined Bandula's column on the march to defeat British forces at Gadawpalin, and went on to capture Cox's Bazar. The destruction at Ramu caused extreme panic in Chittagong and in Calcutta. The Burmese victory too contributed to the Barrackpore mutiny of 1824 where tales of mystical prowess of the Burmese was exaggerated. However Bandula, not wanting to overstretch his lines, stopped Sa from proceeding to Chittagong even though it was lightly held. Had the Burmese taken it, it would open the way to Calcutta. A threat to Calcutta could have potentially forced the British into giving more favourable terms in the peace negotiations to the Burmese kingdom or at least contribute more troops on the Arakan frontier rather than to Rangoon.

Furthermore, the British occupation of Rangoon and naval assault forced the offensive to halt and return to Burma. Sa and his veterans would return to Arakan while Bandula brought the rest of his men back to Rangoon to face the 11,000 strong expeditionary force under Sir Archibald Campbell.

The British would later return to Arakan with a much larger army of 10,000 men including two Royal regiments, cavalry and thirty artillery pieces led by high profiled officers such as War of 1812 veteran Joseph Wanton Morrison and Colquhoun Grant. Although the British would finally defeat Sa and his depleted men in the Battle of Mrauk U on April 1, 1825, Morrison and many of his men suffered greatly from tropical diseases.
