= Barrackpore mutiny of 1824 =

Rising of native Indian sepoys against British officers in Barrackpore, India

Coordinates: 22.76°N 88.37°E

- Part of the First Anglo-Burmese War
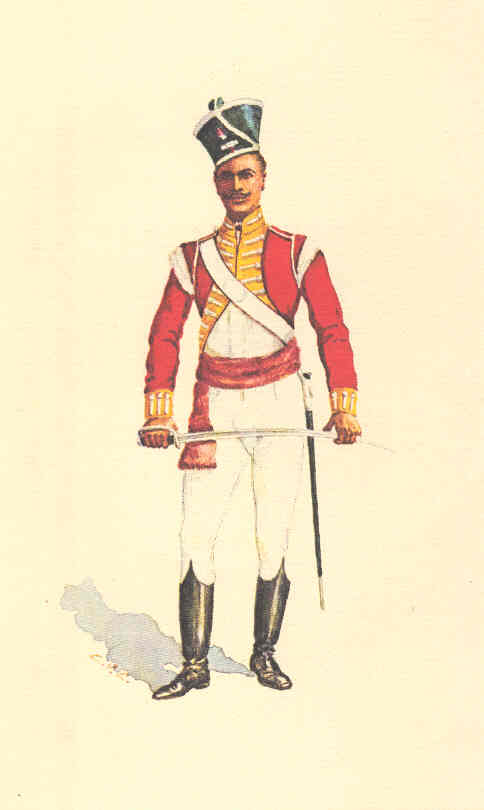
- A Subadar of the early nineteenth century from the Bengal Native Infantry in his army uniform (published in An Assemblage of Indian Army Soldiers & Uniforms from the original paintings by the late Chater Paul Chater)
Date	Nov. 2, 1824
Location	Barrackpore, Bengal Province, British India
Result	British victory: Barrackpore mutiny of 1824 suppressed

Belligerents
United Kingdom: British East India Company	Indian rebel sepoys

Commanders and leaders
Commander-in-Chief, India Sir Edward Paget: Maj-Gen Dalzell, Bengal Presidency; Lt-Col D'Aguilar, 26th BNI; Lt-Col Cartwright, 47th BNI; Major Roope, 62nd BNI	Bindee (Binda) Tiwary (executed)

Units involved
1st (Royal) Regiment; British 47th Regiment; One squadron of horse artillery; Governor General's body guards; 62nd Regiment of BNI (Loyals); 26th Regiment of BNI (Loyals)	Indian sepoys of: 47th Regiment of BNI; 62nd Regiment of BNI (Defectors); 26th Regiment of BNI (Defectors)

Casualties and losses
2 killed from friendly fire	12 hanged 180 sepoys killed during the conflict.
- Barrackpore (Barrackpur), West Bengal, India

The Barrackpore mutiny was a rising of native Indian sepoys against their British officers in Barrackpore in November 1824. The incident occurred when the British East India Company was fighting the First Anglo-Burmese War (1824–1826) under the leadership of the Governor-General of Bengal, William Amherst, 1st Earl Amherst.

The mutiny had its roots in British insensitivity towards Indian cultural sentiments, combined with negligence and poor supply arrangements, which caused growing resentment amongst the sepoys of several regiments of the Bengal Native Infantry after a long march from Mathura to Barrackpore. The lack of transport for personal effects and cultural concerns about being transported by sea caused apprehension, and when troops from the 47th Native Infantry appeared on parade, the troops refused to march towards Chittagong unless their grievances were remedied. Attempts to resolve the dispute failed and dissent spread to elements of the 26th and 62nd Regiments. The Commander-in-Chief, India, General Sir Edward Paget, ordered the troops to lay down their arms before considering their requests for redress. When the sepoys refused, their camp was surrounded by loyal soldiers from the 26th and 62nd Regiments and two British regiments. After a final ultimatum, the camp was attacked with artillery and infantry and around 180 sepoys were killed, as were a number of civilian bystanders.

In the aftermath, a number of mutineers were hanged and others sentenced to long periods of penal servitude. The 47th Regiment was disbanded and its Indian officers dismissed, while its European officers were transferred to other regiments. The incident was largely suppressed in the Indian and British media, with only limited information being released to the British public; despite this, there was Parliamentary criticism of the East India Company government for its heavy-handedness in dealing with the sepoys' grievances.

== Background ==
=== Prelude ===
During the First Anglo-Burmese War, in October 1824, the 26th, 47th and 62nd Regiments of the Bengal Native Infantry were ordered to march 500 mi (800 km) from Barrackpore, a military cantonment in Bengal near Calcutta, to Chittagong in preparation for entering Burmese territory. The regiments had just marched almost 1,000 mi (1,600 km) from Mathura to Barrackpore and were reluctant to undertake another long march, this time against the Burmese, an unknown enemy. Rumours of magical Burmese prowess spread amongst the Indian sepoys, affecting their morale particularly after the Burmese victory at Ramu. Moreover, these three regiments consisted mostly of Hindus, who had reservations about crossing the sea due to the kala pani taboo.

=== Immediate causes ===
Apart from fear and fatigue, what disheartened the sepoys the most was the absence of carriage cattle. Each high caste soldier used his own brass cooking utensils, wrapped in a bundle that also included his bedding. Because of their weight, the bundles could not be carried by the soldiers in addition to their knapsacks, muskets and ammunition. At the time, bullocks were generally used to pull the carts carrying the bundles. For the march to Chittagong, no bullocks could be found, since almost all the available animals had already been purchased for the sea-borne expedition to Rangoon. The few bullocks that were available were of inferior quality and cost exorbitant rates beyond the means of the sepoys, who requested that the government should provide the bullocks or pay them double batta (the allowance paid when in hostile territory) to cover the cost of purchasing them. These requests were disregarded and the sepoys were instead advised to carry whatever they could in their knapsacks and to leave the rest behind. To resolve the situation, commanding officers offered a 4,000 rupee advance to each regiment. The sepoys turned down this offer as it still meant paying baggage charges out of their own pocket. The situation was escalated by threats from a Muslim Indian subedar major, that if they did not stop complaining about the bullocks, they would be sent by sea.

== Events of the rebellion ==
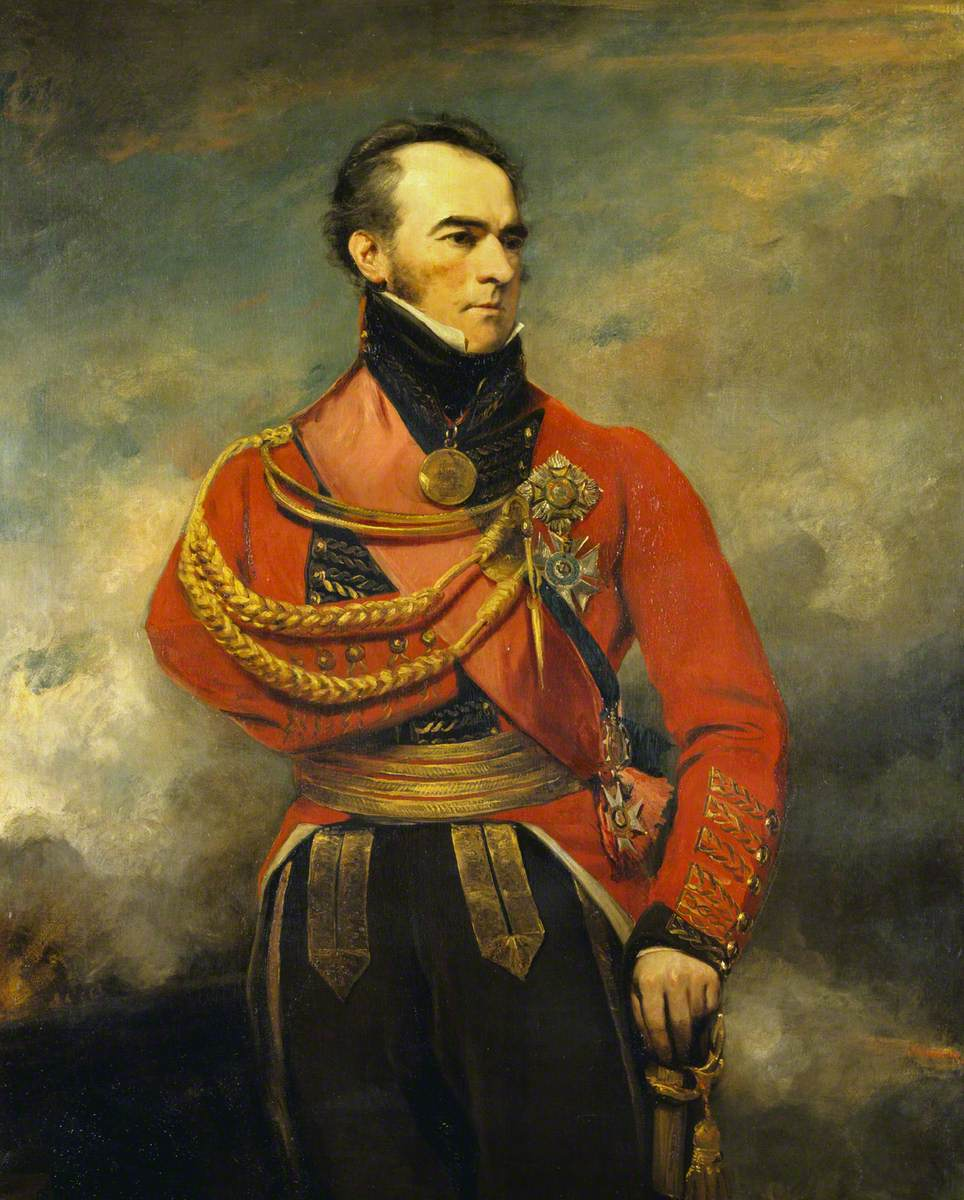
A portrait of General Sir Edward Paget, who suppressed the mutiny.

The 26th Regiment was ordered to march first, followed by the 47th and then the 62nd Regiment. In a last moment change of orders, the 47th Regiment was asked to commence the march on 1 November 1824, followed by the other two regiments who were ordered to start within a week of the 47th Regiment's departure. A parade was held on 1 November, during which the soldiers of the 47th Native Infantry appeared without their knapsacks and refused to bring them even when ordered to do so. They again demanded their carriage bullocks or payment of double batta and refused to march without a redress of grievances. The commanding officer, General Dalzell, was unable to subdue the discontent and proceeded to Calcutta to consult the Commander-in-Chief, India, General Sir Edward Paget. The other two regiments were also affected and twenty Indian sepoys from the 26th BNI and 160 from the 62nd BNI defected to the refractory sepoys of the 47th Regiment.

Under the leadership of Bindee Tiwari, the sepoys maintained order during the day and stayed on the parade ground all night, while a petition was sent to Paget, who arrived from Calcutta on hearing of the escalation. Sepoys presented their demands to Paget via an emissary and explained that their act was due to religious scruples and requested to be dismissed from service, if the demands were not met. Paget replied that legitimate demands would only be addressed after the sepoys laid down their arms. This promise of reconsideration was not enough for the sepoys to give up their position. Paget, an old school martinet of Royal Service, considered this refusal an act of armed mutiny. He summoned two regiments of European troops, the 47th (Lancashire) Regiment of Foot and the 1st (Royal) Regiment, as well as troops of the Governor General's bodyguard from Calcutta. He also brought horse artillery from nearby Dum Dum.

On the morning of 2 November, the reinforcements and the loyal members of the 26th and 62nd Regiments moved into position. They secretly surrounded the sepoy camp ground and a final message was sent to the mutineers, demanding that they lay down arms before any discussion on grievances but it is said that only ten minutes were offered to make up their minds. The sepoys either hesitated or rejected the ultimatum and Paget ordered two cannons to fire on the rebels, followed by an attack from the rear by the secretly placed horse artillery. Surprised by this sudden assault, the sepoys tried to flee but the rest of the British regiments attacked from all directions. Some of the sepoys jumped into the Hooghly River to escape and drowned, others entered local households for shelter but the loyalists chased them in and killed them with bayonets. Many bystanders, including women and children who happened to be in the neighbourhood, were killed during the operation. Afterwards, it was found that the muskets of the Indian sepoys were not loaded. Stevenson concludes that this implies no violence was intended by the rebels.

== Casualties ==
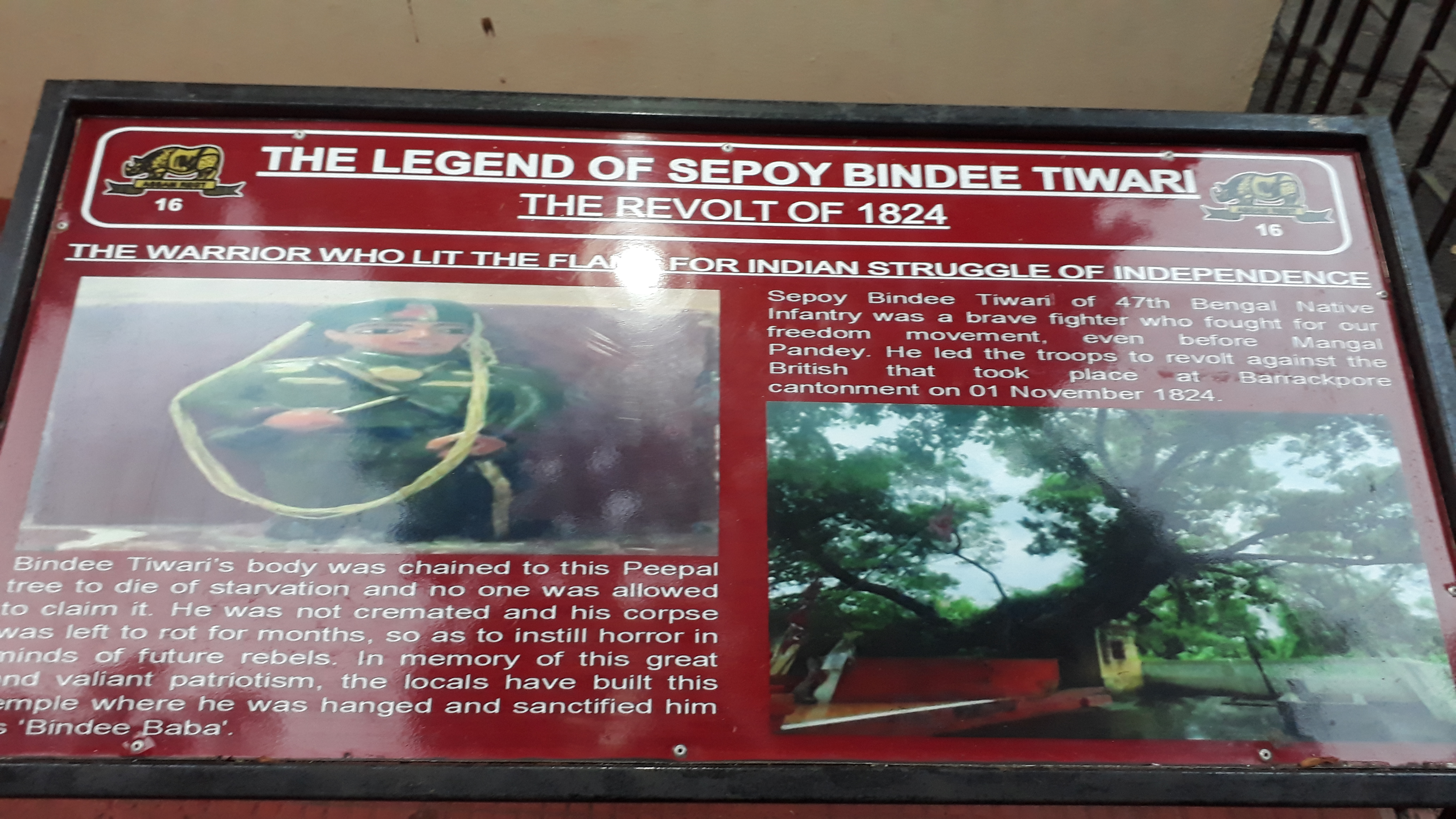
A board on Bindee Tiwari's revolt at Barrackpore Cantonment

Of about 1,400 mutineers, 180 were killed during the attack, although the death toll is disputed. Bengal Hurkaru, a local semi-official newspaper, published a report in November 1824, stating that the number of deceased was 100, per a "perfect guess". In 1827, Joseph Hume, an opposition MP, reported on the floor of the British Parliament that the number was from 400 to 600 per the "facts that had reached him from India". In response Charles Williams-Wynn, a Tory MP, claimed on behalf of the government, that the number was no more than 180.

== Aftermath ==
=== Punishment of the mutineers ===
Most of the remaining mutineers were captured and on 2 November, eleven sepoys were identified as the ring leaders and received a swift trial, where they were sentenced to death by hanging. Six of these were from 47th BNI, four were from 62nd BNI and one was from 26th BNI, who were killed the same day in the parade ground. Around 52 sepoys were sentenced to fourteen years' hard labour, in chains, on roads; numerous others were sentenced with lesser terms. On 4 November, by a general order issued from Fort William, the 47th Regiment was disbanded and its Indian officers disgraced, discharged and declared unworthy of the confidence of the government, as it was thought mutiny could not have occurred without their knowledge. All the British officers were transferred to a new 69th Regiment. On 9 November, Bindee was arrested nearby, and suffered the especially harsh punishment of being hung in chains on the next day. His body was left to rot for months in open public display.

=== Press censorship ===
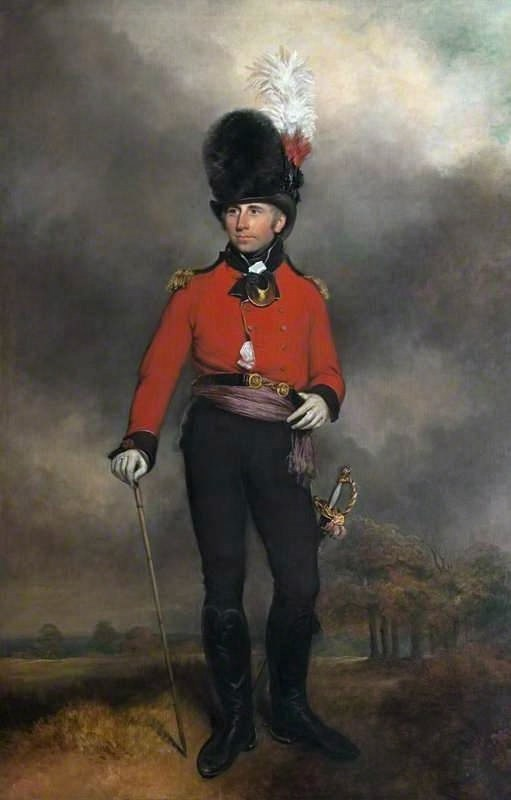
Earl Amherst, Governor General of India, was harshly criticised by a British newspaper report.

The news of the unrest in Barrackpore, especially concerning the use of violence to subdue a peaceful protest, was suppressed in public media in Calcutta, London and elsewhere. The colonial government maintained its silence except for a short official paragraph published in the Calcutta Gazette on 4 November, where the incident was largely trivialised, with no mention of casualties. Bengal Hurkaru, a local semi-official newspaper under the editorship of a British Deputy Judge-Advocate, also published a short report in November 1824. The report played down the incident and lacked basic details including the cause of the mutiny, stating that they were not allowed to publish such details. Apart from these two reports, common Indians and Britons were largely kept uninformed about the incident, although rumours circulated.

=== Later criticism in press ===
The Oriental Herald in London first published a story on the subject almost six months after the incident, calling it the "Barrackpore Massacre", based on a report by a British correspondent in Calcutta. The Oriental Herald severely criticised the conduct of the British officers present, Paget in particular for resorting to violence to suppress a peaceful protest, and demanded increased pay for the sepoys as well the provision of transport for luggage. It also sought a consistent and truthful account of the incident from the government. The report was particularly harsh in its criticism of Amherst, whom it labelled an "evil genius", blaming him for the escalation:

If this example was necessary to preserve the obedience of the native troops, how miserably precarious is the tenure of our authority! If it was not necessary, may God forgive those who have brought this stain upon British name.

— Barrackpore Massacre – Burmese War – Present State of the Native Army in Bengal, The Oriental Herald, Volume 5, 1825.

=== Consequences ===
After the suppression of the mutiny, many sepoys deserted British service. A Court of Inquiry was set up to investigate the incident. All that is known about its report was that it agreed that the sepoys had justifiable grievances. Bengal units designated for 'General Service' were given all the concessions that the rebellious sepoys had originally demanded. The 1824 incident created an atmosphere of distrust across the native Indian regiments and irrevocably harmed relations between British officers and native Indian sepoys.

No disciplinary measures were taken against Paget or any other officer of the army, contrary to expectations. Amherst came close to being recalled for mishandling the situation but ultimately retained his position.

=== Debate in British Parliament ===
On 22 March 1827, a parliamentary debate in the House of Commons discussed the Barrackpore Mutiny. Hume, a Radical MP from the opposition, described the incident to his colleagues, criticising the conduct of the military, and appealed for a fresh investigation to identify those responsible; he perceived that Amherst was showing a lack of will in finding the real culprits. He also alleged that the report of the Court of Inquiry was being suppressed, demanded that the full report be produced in Parliament, and appealed for the House to hear both sides of the dispute and come to a just conclusion. Tory MPs from the government side, such as Wynn and Davies, objected to the proposal and supported Amherst and Paget. At the end of the debate, the motion for a fresh investigation and the presentation of the inquiry's report to the House was defeated, 44 votes for the motion and 176 against.

== Historical significance ==
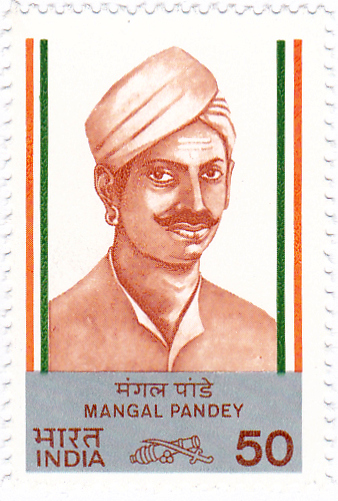
A 1984 postage stamp depicting sepoy Mangal Pandey, who was involved in a subsequent incident at Barrackpore that contributed to the Indian rebellion of 1857.

The Barrackpore cantonment was the site of another mutinous incident thirty-three years later on 29 March 1857 involving sepoy Mangal Pandey. The 24th Chief of Army Staff of the Indian Army, Major General V.K. Singh (2010–2012), wrote extensively about the 1824 Barrackpore mutiny. He reflects:

What shocked everyone was not the mutiny itself but the brutal manner in which it was quelled. The bloodshed could have been avoided if the situation had been handled with tact and understanding by the officers, particularly General Paget. Though the mutiny was quickly suppressed – it lasted for less than a day – its long term effects were far reaching and had a bearing on the Great Indian Mutiny of 1857.

— Gen V.K. Singh, Barrackpore Mutiny, Contribution of the Armed Forces to the Freedom Movement in India

The events of 1824 continued to haunt Britons and Indians for many years and many felt that it provided Indian sepoys the rationale to kill British officers in 1857.

== Memorial ==
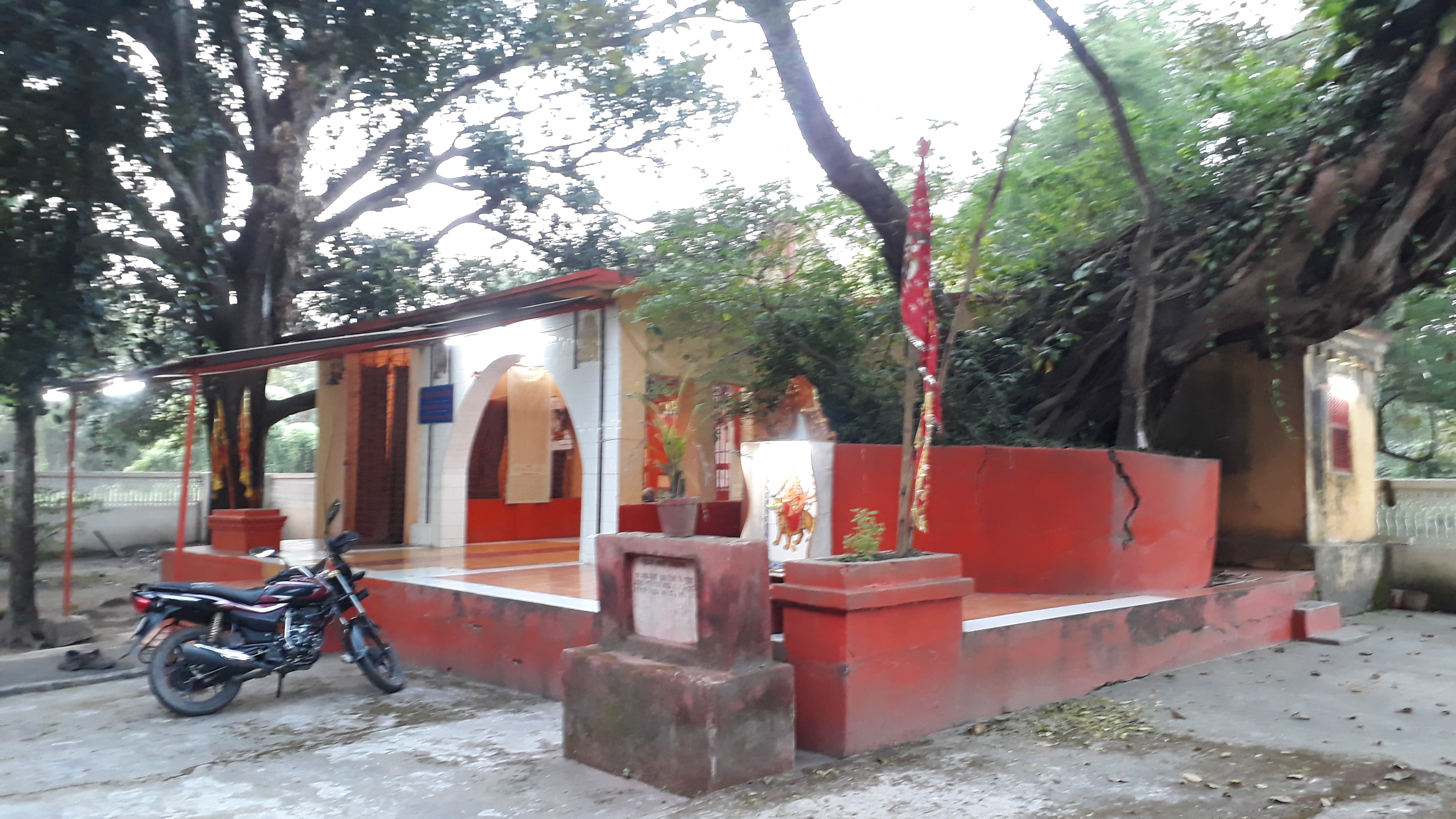
Bindi Tiwari Temple in Barrackpore Cantonment

Bindee became a martyr and a fabled hero among the Indian sepoys especially after his death. To commemorate the incident, six months after Bindee's death, Indian sepoys and locals erected a temple near the site of his execution. Binda Baba temple as it is now known, still stands.

== See also ==
- Vellore Mutiny
- Bengal Native Infantry

== Sources ==
- The Asiatic Journal And Monthly Miscellany. Vol. 23. London: Parbury, Allen, & Co. 1827. OCLC 1514448.
- Chaurasia, Radhey Shyam (2002). History of Modern India, 1707 A. D. to 2000 A. D. Atlantic Publishers & Distributors. ISBN 978-81-269-0085-5.
- The Edinburgh Annual Register for 1824. Vol. 17. Edinburgh: James Ballantyne and Co. 1825. OCLC 4043682.
- Mazumdar, Jaideep (25 August 2008). "The First Martyr". The Outlook India. Chennai: 20–22. OCLC 780044933.
- Menezes, S. L. (1993). Fidelity & Honour: The Indian Army from the Seventeenth to the Twenty-first Century. New Delhi: Viking. ISBN 978-0-670-83995-7.
- The Oriental Herald and Journal of General Literature. Vol. 5. London: Sandford Arnot. 1825. OCLC 231706887.
- The Oriental Herald and Journal of General Literature. Vol. 6. London: Sandford Arnot. 1825. OCLC 231706887.
- The Oriental Herald And Journal of General Literature. Vol. 13. London: Sandford Arnot. 1827. OCLC 457180515.
- Pogson, Wredenhall Robert (1833). Memoir of the Mutiny at Barrackpore. Serampore Press. OCLC 913201086.
- Ritchie, Leitch (1846). The British World in the East – A Guide Historical, Moral, and Commercial, to India, China, Australia, South Africa, and the other Possessions or Connexions of Great Britain in Eastern and South Sea. The Making of the Modern World. Vol. 2. W. H. Allen. OCLC 213828161.
- Singh, Vijay Kumar (2009). Contribution of the Armed Forces to the Freedom Movement in India (PDF). New Delhi: KW.
- Stevenson, Richard (2015). Beatson's Mutiny: The Turbulent Career of a Victorian Soldier. London·New York: I. B. Tauris. ISBN 9780857736918.
- Wilson, Horace Hayman (1848). The History of British India From 1805 to 1835. Vol. 3. London: James Madden. OCLC 21056502.
