= Misripara Seema Buddha Bihar =

Buddhist temple in Patuakhali District, Bangladesh

Coordinates: 21.8338°N 90.1762°E

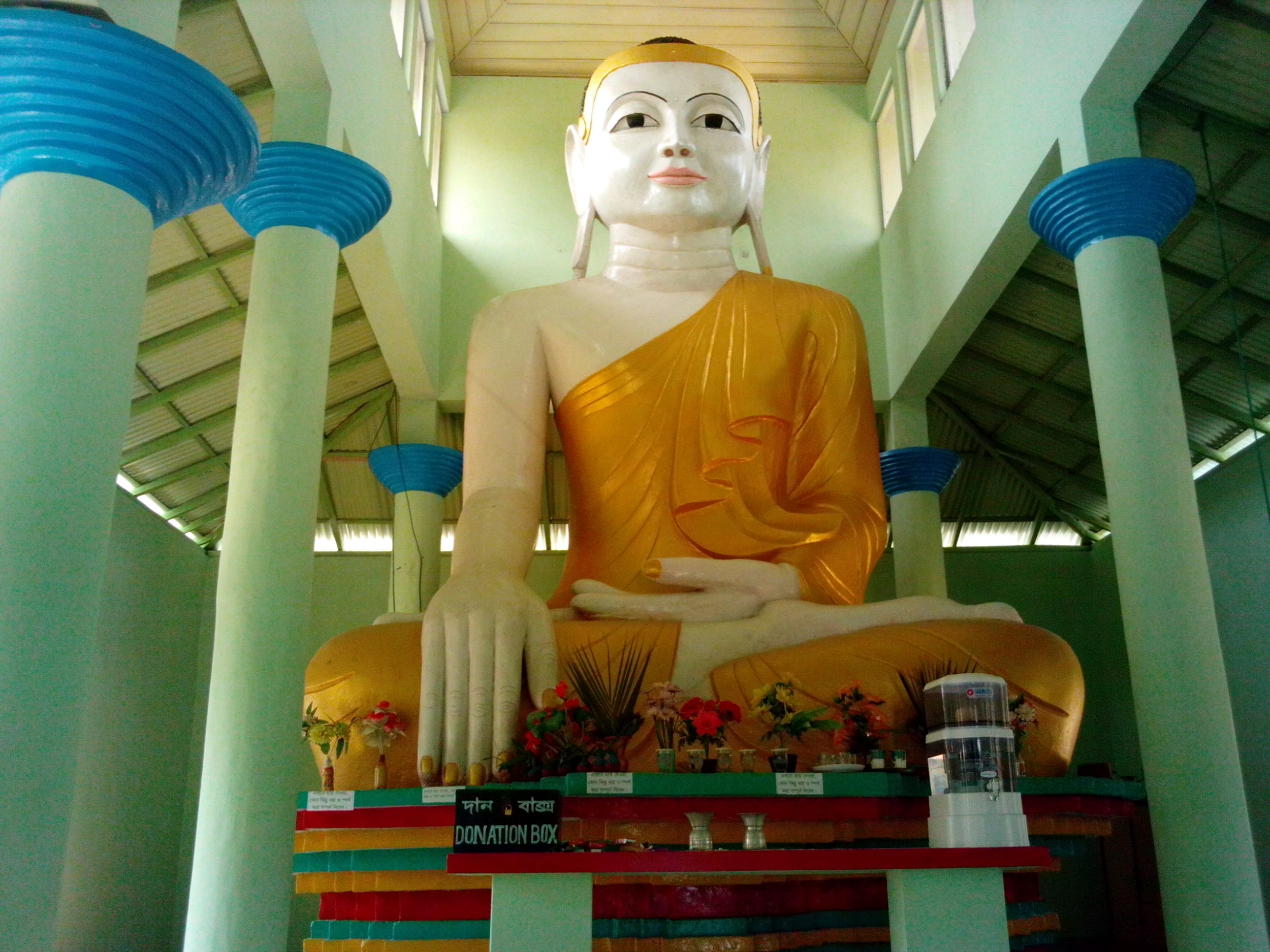
Statue of Goutom Buddha in the temple

Misripara Seema Buddha Bihar is a Buddhist temple located at Misripara village of Latachapli Union Parishad in Patuakhali District in Bangladesh. Though it primarily serves as place of worship for the Buddhist Rakhine people, it has also become a local attraction for tourists coming to Kuakata Beach. This temple has a big statue of Gautama Buddha, and is locally known as Misripara Buddha Mandir. It is four kilometers away from Kuakata Buddhist Temple.
