= Anglo-Burmese Wars =

Three wars between Britain and Burma

- Part of European colonization of Southeast Asia
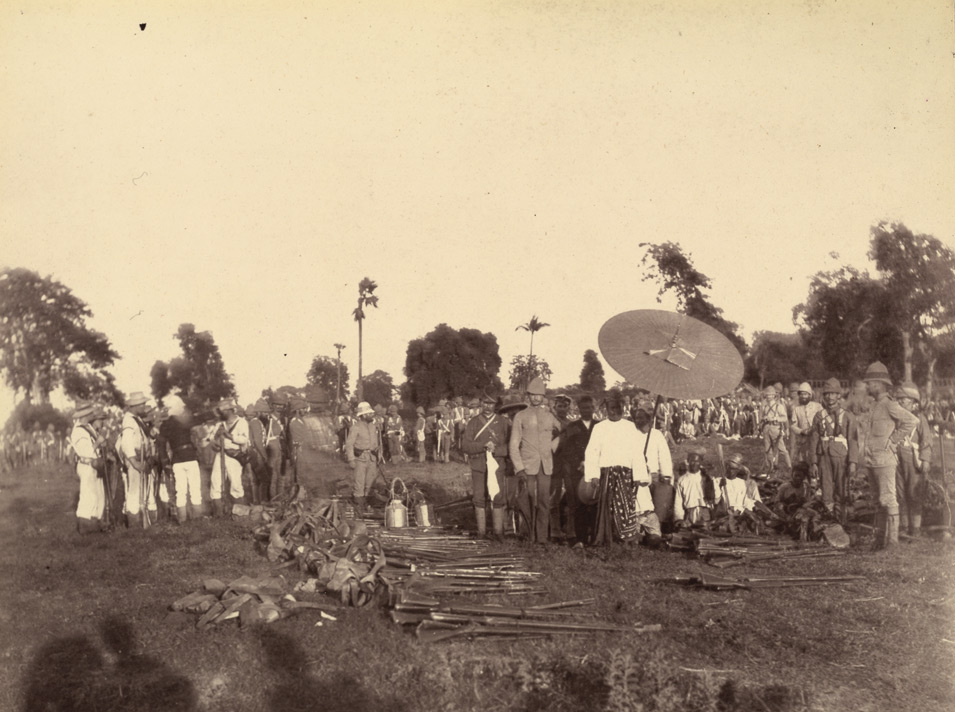
- Photograph of surrender of the Burmese Army, 3rd Anglo-Burmese War
Date	5 March 1824 – 29 November 1885
Location	Burma, East Bengal, Assam, Manipur, Cachar and Jaintia
Result	British victory: End of the Konbaung dynasty; Start of British rule in Burma; Beginning of Burmese resistance
Territorial changes	All territories of the Konbaung dynasty annexed into British India

Belligerents
United Kingdom: East India Company (until 1858); India (from 1858); Co-belligerent: Siam (until 1826)	Burma: Shan States

Commanders and leaders
(United Kingdom of Great Britain and Ireland) Henry Godwin (United Kingdom of Great Britain and Ireland) Garnet Wolseley (British Raj) Harry Prendergast (East India Company) William Amherst (United Kingdom of Great Britain and Ireland) Edward Paget (United Kingdom of Great Britain and Ireland) Archibald Campbell (United Kingdom of Great Britain and Ireland) Joseph Morrison # Co-belligerent: (Rattanakosin Kingdom (1782–1932)) Rama III (Rattanakosin Kingdom (1782–1932)) Chaophraya Mahayotha (Rattanakosin Kingdom (1782–1932)) Phraya Surasena (Rattanakosin Kingdom (1782–1932)) Phraya Chumphon (Jaipur State) (United Kingdom of Great Britain and Ireland) Henry Godwin (United Kingdom of Great Britain and Ireland) Garnet Wolseley (British Raj) Harry Prendergast (East India Company) William Amherst (United Kingdom of Great Britain and Ireland) Edward Paget (United Kingdom of Great Britain and Ireland) Archibald Campbell (United Kingdom of Great Britain and Ireland) Joseph Morrison # Co-belligerent: (Rattanakosin Kingdom (1782–1932)) Rama III (Rattanakosin Kingdom (1782–1932)) Chaophraya Mahayotha (Rattanakosin Kingdom (1782–1932)) Phraya Surasena (Rattanakosin Kingdom (1782–1932)) Phraya Chumphon	(Konbaung dynasty) Bagyidaw (Konbaung dynasty) Thibaw Min (POW) (Konbaung dynasty) Pagan Min (Konbaung dynasty) Maung Gyi (Konbaung dynasty) Kyauk Lon (Konbaung dynasty) Maha Bandula † (Konbaung dynasty) Maha Ne Myo †; Myawaddy U Sa (Konbaung dynasty) Minkyaw Thura

Units involved
(East India Company) Presidency armies (United Kingdom) Royal Regiments; Co-belligerent: (Rattanakosin Kingdom (1782–1932)) Royal Siamese Army	(Konbaung dynasty) Royal Burmese armed forces: Shan Levies

Strength
Around 80,000 to 100,000 (including Siamese)	40,000 at full strength with allies, 20,000 by end of Third Anglo-Burmese War

Casualties and losses
Over 3,000 killed in action, 10,000 wounded, 20,000 died from disease	Over 20,000 casualties, entire generation of fighting men destroyed

The Anglo-Burmese Wars, also known as the Indo-Burmese Wars, were an armed conflict between two expanding empires, the British Empire and the Konbaung dynasty, that became British Indian Empire's most expensive and longest war, costing 5–13 million pounds sterling (£400 million – £1.1 billion as of 2019) and spanning over 60 years. There were three of these wars between 1824 and 1885.

== Chronology ==
The expansion of Burma (present-day Myanmar) under the Konbaung dynasty had consequences along its frontiers. As those frontiers moved ever closer to the British East India Company and later British India, there were problems both with refugees and military operations spilling over ill-defined borders.

=== First Anglo-Burmese War ===
The First Anglo-Burmese War (1824–1826) ended in a British East India Company victory, and by the Treaty of Yandabo, Burma lost territory previously conquered in Assam, Manipur, and Arakan. The British also took possession of Tenasserim with the intention to use it as a bargaining chip in future negotiations with either Burma or Siam. As the century wore on, the British East India Company began to covet the resources and main part of Burma during an era of great territorial expansion.

=== Second Anglo-Burmese War ===
In 1852, Commodore Lambert was dispatched to Burma by Lord Dalhousie over a number of minor issues related to the previous treaty. The Burmese immediately made concessions including the removal of a governor whom the British had made their casus belli. Lambert eventually provoked a naval confrontation in extremely questionable circumstances and thus started the Second Anglo-Burmese War in 1852, which ended in the British annexation of Pegu province, renamed Lower Burma. The war resulted in a palace revolution in Burma, with King Pagan Min (1846–1853) being replaced by his half brother, Mindon Min (1853–1878).

=== Third Anglo-Burmese War ===
King Mindon tried to modernise the Burmese state and economy to ensure its independence, and he established a new capital at Mandalay, which he proceeded to fortify. These efforts would eventually prove unsuccessful, however, when the British claimed that Mindon's son Thibaw Min (ruled 1878–1885) was a tyrant intending to side with the French, that he had lost control of the country, thus allowing for disorder at the frontiers, and that he was reneging on a treaty signed by his father. The British declared war once again in 1885, conquering the remainder of the country in the Third Anglo-Burmese War resulting in total annexation of Burma.

== See also ==
- Japanese invasion of Burma (during World War II)
