= Battle of Prome =

Coordinates: 18°49′N 95°13′E

- Part of the First Anglo-Burmese War
- Location and year of the major battles of the First Anglo-Burmese War, and Ava, the Court of Kingdom of Burma
Date	November–December 1825
Location	Prome, Kingdom of Burma
Result	British victory

Belligerents
British Empire	Kingdom of Burma

Commanders and leaders
Gen. Archibald Campbell, Willoughby Cotton	Maha Ne Myo †; Mauk-Me Sawbwa †; Minhla Minkhaung

Strength
3,000 Europeans and 2,000 Indians	~13,000 soldiers

The battle of Prome was a land-based battle between the Kingdom of Burma and the British Empire that took place near the city of Prome, modern day Pyay, in 1825 as part of the First Anglo-Burmese War. It was the last-ditch effort by the Burmese to drive out the British from Lower Burma. The poorly equipped Burmese army despite the advantage in numbers suffered a defeat. The British army's subsequent march toward north threatened Ava, which led to peace negotiation by the Kingdom of Burma.

Following the defeat at Danubyu and the death of General Maha Bandula, King Bagyidaw ordered the general Maha Ne Myo to capture Prome with an army. With superiority in number, the Burmese army divided into three divisions and positioned themselves around Prome in Simbaik, Napadi hills, and the western shore of Irrawaddy river. The Burmese army harassed the British position in outlying regions around Prome by leading small raids but did not commit to an attack on Prome itself.

The British army, led by Gen. Archibald Campbell, composed of several regiments of Royal Foot infantry and Madras Native infantry and artillery. On 1 December 1825, General Campbell initiated an attack on the left division led by Maha Ne Myo, while distracting the centre division with a cannon barrage. The left division was stormed with a bayonet charge led by Lt. General Willoughby Cotton and a follow-up attack by General Campbell caused a complete rout of the left division of the Burmese army. The British army attacked the center division on the Napadi hills the following day, and due to the bravery of the Native infantry, drove the Burmese troops from the hills. An attack on the right division, situated on the western shore of Irrawaddy river, caused a general retreat of the Burmese army.

== Background ==
After defeating the Burmese army and their commander-in-chief Maha Bandula at Danubyu in April 1825, the British consolidated their gains in Lower Burma (up to Prome), Arakan and Tenasserim coast as well as in Assam and Manipur. Initial peace negotiations were commenced in September 1825 at Ngagyaungbinzeik, 20 miles north of Prome. The British demanded that the Burmese recognize "the independence of Manipur" and "desist from interference with Assam and Cachar", "cede Rakhine and its dependencies", receive a British Resident at the Court of Ava, and pay an indemnity of two million pounds sterling. Yangon, and Taninthayi would be held until the indemnity was paid.

The Court of Ava had not expected, and were unwilling to accept, the complete loss of their western empire and the harsh penalties demanded. But with the army severely depleted, the Burmese envoy, the lord of Kawlin, replied that his government:

1. Would give up any claim to Assam and Manipur
2. Objected to the British choice for the future Manipuri raja
3. Would cede the Tenasserim coast but not Arakan.

The British were unimpressed: "The question is not how much you will cede to us but how much we shall return to you".

The negotiations broke down, and the Burmese decided to fight on despite the fact that the army was severely short of experienced men and arms. (The army's most experienced men had already perished in the previous year. The Burmese lost about 23,000 men in the Battle of Rangoon (May–December 1824) alone.) Over the rainy season of 1825 (June–October), they had raised more men, and the entire Burmese defences now consisted of 30,000 soldiers. However, most of the new conscripts were "ill-trained and ill-equipped".

== Combatants ==
=== Burmese Army ===
The Burmese army responsible for attack on Prome consisted mainly of Shans, and the total strength was about 10,000 men. By one account, the non-Shan portion of the army was only 1300. (The post-war British reporting claim a combined Burmese strength of 50,000 to 60,000. However, later British historians such as GE Harvey reassessed that the Konbaung Dynasty could have raised no more than 60,000 men for the entire war.) The Burmese command had also posted a 3,000-strong army led by Minhla Minkhaung at the western bank of the Irrawaddy north of Prome as a defensive measure.

=== British Army ===
Under the command of General Cotton:

- Regiments of Foot: 1st, 41st (270 men), and 89th (260 men) regiments
- Madras Native Infantry: 18th and 28th regiments
- 250 Royal Engineers
- 100 Pioneers
- Some artillery

Under the command of General Campbell:

- Regiments: 13th, 38th, 47th, and 87th regiments
- The Madras European Regiment
- Madras Native Infantry: 3rd, 7th, 9th, 12th, 18th, 34th, 43rd, 38th regiment
- Bengal Native Infantry: 40th Regiment

Defence at Prome:

- Four Madras Native Infantry regiments

== Battle ==
In November 1825, the Burmese forces under Maha Ne Myo mainly consisted of several Shan regiments led by their own Shan sawbwas, made a daring push to recapture Pyay, and nearly succeeded. But by early December, the superior firepower of the British had won out and defeated the last-ditch effort by the Burmese.

Following the rainy season, the Burmese army in three columns approached Prome. Both flanks of the British position were threatened, but the control of the river was maintained by the command of the flotilla and a detachment, 26th Madras Native Infantry, at Padaung on the right bank. Despite their superiority in numbers, the Burmese forces remained in the protection of the cover of the jungle for several days after their arrival and maintained harassments against the British flanks. As noted by The Annual Register, Burmese warfare style at that time involved "creeping onwards slowly and certainly, stockading and entrenching ... at every step, risking no general engagement ...".

On 1 December General Campbell left four regiments of native infantry in Prome and marched against the division of Maha Ne Myo at Sinbaik, on the left position. To divert the attention of the centre position, a cannon barrage of the flotilla, led by Sir James Brisbane, commenced against the works on the river coordinated with Campbell's march. The barrage was maintained for approximately two hours to maintain the diversion. At the Nawin (Naweng) river, the British army was divided into two columns, and the two columns marched parallel to each other along the river. The right column, led by Brigadier-General Cotton, first encountered the left division of Burmese army, estimated to be 10,000 men strong. The British stormed the Burmese position with a bayonet charge, and caused the Burmese to rout. The left column encountered the retreating Burmese finished their rout. Despite their swift defeat, the Shans troops were noted for their bravery; according to The Annual Register, the Shans " ... fought bravely ... [and] maintained the contest till the greater part of them were cut down."

On 2 December, after the rout of Maha Ne Myo of the left division, Campbell was quick to follow up with an attack on the centre division of the Burmese army, led by Kee-Woonghee, on the Napadi hills. An attack against the defence at the base of the hills was led by six companies of the 87th regiment, and the Burmese army was quickly overwhelmed, retreating to the defensive positions on the hills. The Burmese army maintained a strong position on the Napadi hills, which were accessible only by a narrow road and guarded with artillery. The British army employed a multi-prong attack on the hills: the 13th and 38th regiment of the 1st Bengal brigade engaged the Burmese army from the front while the 87th regiment engaged from the right. The Burmese army was driven from the hills subsequently, and as a result, the two divisions positioned on the eastern shore of the Irrawaddy river had been routed.

On 5 December an attack on the Burmese division led by Minhla Minkhaung commenced with the transport of the troops to the western shore of Irrawaddy river. A rocket brigade and a mortar battery opened fire at the Burmese position and the Burmese troops retreated from the artillery attack. A manned attack led by General Cotton, Brigadier Richard Armstrong, and Colonel Godwin stormed the Burmese position immediately following the artillery attack and dispersed the remaining Burmese troops.

== Aftermath ==
With a large portion of the Burmese army dispersed at Prome, the British army led by Campbell advanced toward Ava unimpeded until they encountered a stockaded defence at Bagan. Due to a diminished military power, the Kingdom of Burma was more inclined to negotiate for peace and accept the terms and demands posed by the British. The first of such negotiations took place on 1 January 1826.

== Sources ==
- Knox, Thomas Wallace (1902). Decisive Battles since Waterloo: The Most Important Military Events from 1815 to 1887. G. P. Putnam's Sons. pp. 17–28.
- India. Army. Intelligence Branch.; India. Army. Intelligence Branch (1907), Frontier and overseas expeditions from India (Frontier and overseas expeditions from India. ed.), Simla: Govt. Monotype Press, OL 5080199M
- The Asiatic journal and monthly register for British and foreign India, China, and Australia, Volume 20. Parbury, Allen, and Co. 1825.
- Oriental herald and journal of general literature, Volume 9. New York Public Library: S.N. 1826. p. 440.
- Robertson, Thomas (1853). Political incidents of the First Burmese War. Richard Bentley. pp. 252. "Kee-Woonghee."
- Harvey, G. E. (1925). History of Burma: From the Earliest Times to 10 March 1824. London: Frank Cass & Co. Ltd.
- Hteik Tin Htwe, Naga Bo (1934). Yadana Theinkha Konbaung Maha Yazawin Akyin (in Burmese) (1967 ed.).
- Htin Aung, Maung (1967). A History of Burma. New York and London: Cambridge University Press.
- Maung Maung Tin (1905). Konbaung Hset Maha Yazawin (in Burmese). Vol. 1–3 (2004 ed.). Yangon: Department of Universities History Research, University of Yangon.
- Myint-U, Thant (2006). The River of Lost Footsteps--Histories of Burma. Farrar, Straus and Giroux. ISBN 978-0-374-16342-6.
- Phayre, Lt. Gen. Sir Arthur P. (1883). History of Burma (1967 ed.). London: Susil Gupta.
