= Thihathura =

Thihathura or Thiha Thura was a Burmese royal title. Today, Thiha Thura is the second highest military decoration awarded by the Burmese military.

Thihathura may mean:

== Royalty ==
- King Thihathu: Co-founder of Myinsaing Kingdom (r. 1298–1312) and founder of Pinya Kingdom (r. 1312–1324)
- King Thihathu of Ava: King of Ava (r. 1422–1426)
- King Narapati of Ava: King of Ava (r. 1443–1469)
- King Thihathura of Ava: King of Ava (r. 1469–1481)
- King Thihathura II of Ava: Joint-King of Ava (r. 1487–1502)
- King Nyaungyan: King of Burma (r. 1599–1606)
- Crown Prince Thado Minsaw: Crown Prince of Burma (r. 1783–1808)

== Generals and ministers ==
- Gen. Maha Thiha Thura (d. 1782): Konbaung-era general
- Myawaddy Mingyi U Sa (1766–1853): Konbaung-era poet, playwright composer, military commander, statesman

== Modern era ==
- Tin Aung Myint Oo: First Secretary of State Peace and Development Council
