= Myawaddy Mingyi U Sa =

- မြဝတီမင်းကြီး ဦးစ
- Born: 28 October 1766; Migyaungtet Chaung, Sagaing District, Kingdom of Myanmar
- Died: 6 August 1853 (aged 86); Ava, Kingdom of Myanmar
- Military career
- Allegiance: Konbaung Dynasty
- Branch: Royal Burmese Army
- Service years: 1808–1836
- Rank: Commander (1808–1814); General (1814–1828); Army Minister (1828–1836)
- Conflicts: Annexation of Manipur (1814); First Anglo-Burmese War (1824–1826)
- Awards: Ne Myo Zeya Thura; Maha Thiha Thura; Thiri Maha Zeya Thura, Lord of Myawaddy
- Other work: musician, songwriter, playwright, diplomat

Myawaddy Mingyi U Sa (Burmese: မြဝတီမင်းကြီး ဦးစ, pronounced [mja̰wədì mɪ́ɰ̃dʑí ʔú sa̰]; 28 October 1766 – 6 August 1853) was a Konbaung-era Burmese poet, composer, playwright, general and statesman. In a royal service career that spanned over six decades, the Lord of Myawaddy served under four kings in various capacities, and was a longtime secretary to King Bagyidaw. Multi-talented Sa is best remembered for his innovative contributions to classical Burmese music and drama, as well as for his brilliant military service.

Sa composed many songs in various styles drawn from different traditions, wrote several plays and dramas including translated works from Thai and Javanese dramas, and brought innovations to Burmese theater. He invented the 13-string Burmese harp and introduced marionette plays to the Ava court. Sa was also an able military commander who led King Bodawpaya's annexation of Manipur in 1813. As the commander of Arakan theater under Gen. Maha Bandula in the First Anglo-Burmese War of 1824–1826, Sa was the most successful of the Burmese commanders achieving the few battlefield victories against the British in an otherwise disastrous war.

After the war, he became minister of Army and was given Myawaddy as his fief in 1828. Sa led the Burmese diplomatic efforts to have the British abandon their claims to Kabaw Valley in 1830. He was imprisoned from 1836 to 1839 by King Tharrawaddy, who overthrew Bagyidaw. Sa held no further public office after his release from prison, but continued to write songs and plays for kings Tharrawaddy and Pagan.

== Early life ==
Maung Sa was born 28 October 1766 (10th waning of Thadingyut 1128 ME) at Migyaungtet Chaung village, near Sagaing to a family line of courtiers more than two hundred years old. His father Pauk Kyaw was a son of the Royal Household Guards, and his mother Nyein Tha was a granddaughter of Binnya Gyandaw, a minister in the court of King Thalun making him of a scion of both Bama and Mon noble heritage. He was schooled at the Parama Monastery in the capital Ava. Still a teenager, Sa married Ma Aye, daughter of the King's goldsmith Nyun of Sagaing. Sa worked as a goldsmith and dealer. His wife died in 1785, when he was just 19. After the death of his wife, Sa briefly became an itinerant player of kye-waing (brass gongs) in U Tayoke's orchestra in Ava. Sa quickly gained recognition as an accomplished musician, and was noticed by Crown Prince Thado Minsaw who was bringing together a circle of innovative young artists in his private court. Still 19, Sa joined the Royal Service to become a royal page, a kind of apprenticeship only open to members of gentry and nobility.

== Career ==
=== Artist ===
One of his first assignments in the royal service was to record the stories of traditional Burmese spirits Thirty Seven Nats, along with their traditional rituals, dances and music. He accomplished the task with the aid of musicians Tayoke and Myat Tha. In 1789, the 23-year-old Sa was placed in a Royal Commission consisted of princes and ministers, charged with translating Siamese and Javanese dramas from Thai to Burmese. (Siamese court musicians and artists captured from Ayutthaya in 1767 had been staging performances in the Burmese court, and training Burmese professional actors in Siamese style.) With the help of Siamese artists, the commission adapted two important epics from Thai to Burmese: the Siamese Ramayana and the Enao, the Siamese version of Javanese Panji tales into Burmese Yama Zatdaw and Enaung Zatdaw. With Enaung, Sa wrote the dialogue, songs, musical scores, arrangements and stage directions. Sa also updated the 7-string Burmese harp into a 13-string one.

He composed over forty classical thachin-gans, kyos, bwes and patpyos. Influenced by Siamese and Mon music, Sa experimented with different musical styles. He wrote many "Yodaya" (Burmese for Ayutthaya) style songs: "htat-tunts", "ngu-ngits", "khameins", "frantins", "keet-muns", "htanauks", ale-mes, "phyinchars", "bayet-le-swes", and "phyin-chins;" some are for oboes and others for brass-gongs. He also wrote three types of songs in Mon style. In 1820, Sa resumed his compilation of the stories of the Thirty-Seven Nats, in collaboration with Kawi Deva Kyaw, a leading Nat medium, and historian U Nu. In the same year he experimented with marionette shows, in consultation with Thabin Wun, Curator of Dramatic Arts.

After the First Anglo-Burmese War, Sa continued to write plays but spent more time on music. He collected songs from all sources, Siamese, Burmese, Mon, and from all levels: songs sung at court, songs sung by spirit worshipers, songs sung at feasts and folk songs. He continued his experiments in blending the various musical traditions of the country. Ever the curious, Sa taught himself some Hindi and some Latin hymns.

=== Military commander ===
In 1808, Sa was named Herald and Commander of Warboat Pye Lon Yu, and later atwinwun (secretary) to the new Crown Prince Bagyidaw. In February 1814, Commander Sa with the title Ne Myo Zeya Thura led a Burmese army of 1500 soldiers and 150 cavalry into Manipur to place Marjit Singh on the Manipuri throne. At 53, Sa became secretary to the king, when Bagyidaw ascended to the Burmese throne in 1819.

When war broke out with the British in March 1824, Sa was assigned as a general under Supreme Commander Maha Bandula in the Arakan theater. In May 1824, Sa led a column (about 4000) into Bengal, and defeated British troops in the Battle of Ramu, 10 miles east of Cox's Bazar on 17 May 1824. He then joined Bandula's column on the march to defeat British forces at Gadawpalin, and went on to capture Cox's Bazar. Sa's success caused extreme panic in Chittagong and in Calcutta but a cautious Bandula stopped Sa from proceeding too far ahead.

Sa was left to command remaining Burmese troops in Arakan after Bandula and the main battalions were ordered to withdraw from Arakan by Bagyidaw to meet the British invasion in Yangon in August 1824. Sa held on to Arakan throughout 1824 when the main focal point of the war played out in Yangon. After Gen. Archibald Campbell finally defeated Gen. Bandula in the Battle of Yangon in December 1824, the British turned their sights to Arakan. On 1 February 1825, an invasion force of 11,000 soldiers supported by a flotilla of gun boats and armed cruisers along the coast and a squadron of cavalry under the command of Gen. Morrison attacked Burmese positions in Arakan. Despite their superior numbers and firearms, the British had to fight Sa's depleted Burmese forces for nearly two months before they reached to the main Burmese garrison at Mrauk-U, Arakan's capital. On 29 March 1825, the British launched their attack on Mrauk-U. (At the same time, Campbell also launched an attack on Bandula's positions in the Battle of Danubyu.) After a few days of fighting, the Burmese at Mrauk-U were defeated on April 1, coincidentally the same day Maha Bandula fell at Danubyu. Sa and remaining Burmese forces evacuated and left Arakan. The British proceeded to occupy the rest of Arakan. Sa saw firsthand the destructive power and discipline of the British army.

=== Statesman ===
After the war, Sa remained a close adviser to the king. In 1828, Bagyidaw made Sa his Army Minister with Myawaddy as his fief. Sa's fiefdom covered all the land at the confluence of the Made and Irrawaddy Rivers, including 14 villages and a town, in present-day Magwe Division. Now known as Myawaddy Mingyi (Lord of Myawaddy) with a noble style Thiri Maha Zeya Thura, Sa led Burmese diplomatic negotiations with the British resident envoy to Ava, Major Henry Burney. While Sa was unable to get back Arakan and Tenasserim, Sa was able to convince Burney to abandon the British claims on Kabaw Valley as part of Manipur. Starting in the late 1820s, Sa directed translation of English language newspapers for the king and the court.

=== Prisoner ===
In 1836, Prince Tharrawaddy, who was also a commander in the war, rebelled against his brother King Bagyidaw. As Bagyidaw's secretary, Sa was duly arrested by Tharrawaddy. When Tharrawaddy became king in 1837, he stripped Sa of his lordship and imprisoned him for two more years in road gang. Sa was released from prison in 1839 after he composed songs for a royal marionette show and for he had long been a favorite of Tharrawaddy's daughter Princess Supayagyi. Sa was then 73 and held no further public office. He continued to write songs for kings Tharrawaddy and Pagan. He died on 6 August 1853 (1st waxing of Wagaung 1215 ME) at age 86, soon after King Mindon ascended the throne.

== In popular culture ==
- Portrayed by Daung in From Chao Phraya to Irrawaddy, a 2022 Thai-Burmese television series.
