= Treaty of Yandabo =

1826 treaty ending the First Anglo-Burmese War

Treaty of Yandabo ရန္တပိုစာချုပ်
Treaty of Peace between the East India Company and His Majesty the King of Ava
- Signed: 24 February 1826; 200 years ago
- Location: Yandabo, Burmese Empire
- Signatories: Kingdom of Konbaung; British East India Company
- Languages: English, Burmese

The Treaty of Yandabo (Burmese: ရန္တပိုစာချုပ် [jàɰ̃dəbò sàdʑoʊʔ]) was the peace treaty that ended the First Anglo-Burmese War. The treaty was signed on 24 February 1826, nearly two years after the war formally broke out on 5 March 1824, by General Sir Archibald Campbell on the British side, and the Governor of Legaing Maha Min Hla Kyaw Htin from the Burmese side, without any due permission and consent of the Ahom kingdom, Kachari kingdo, m or the other territories covered in the treaty. With the British army at Yandabo village, only 80 km (50 mi) from the capital Ava, the Burmese were forced to accept the British terms without discussion.

According to the treaty, the Burmese agreed to:

- Cede to the British Assam, Manipur, Rakhine (Arakan), and the Tanintharyi (Tenasserim) coast.
- Cease all interference in Cachar and the Jaintia Hills district.
- Pay an indemnity of one million pounds sterling in four installments.
- Allow an exchange of diplomatic representatives between Ava and Calcutta.
- Sign a commercial treaty in due course.

The treaty ended the longest and most expensive war in British Indian history. Fifteen thousand European and Indian soldiers died, together with an unknown (but almost certainly higher) number of Burmese. The campaign cost the British five million pounds sterling (roughly 18.5 billion in 2006 dollars) to 13 million pounds sterling; this expenditure led to a severe economic crisis in British India in 1833.

For the Burmese, it was to be the beginning of the end of their independence. The Third Burmese Empire, briefly the terror of British India, was effectively undone, crippled, and no longer a threat to the eastern frontier of British India. The Burmese would be crushed for years to come by repaying the huge indemnity of one million pounds (then US$5 million), a large sum even in Europe at that time. The British would wage two more wars against the much weaker Burmese and swallow up the entire country by 1885.

== Initial negotiations ==
The British were already in a commanding position when initial peace negotiations commenced in September 1825 in Ngagyaungbinzeik, 20 miles north of Pyay (Prome). After their victory at the Battle of Danubyu in April 1825 that killed Burmese commander-in-chief Gen. Maha Bandula, the British consolidated their gains in Lower Burma, Rakhine, and Taninthayi coasts as well as in Assam and Manipur. The British demanded that the Burmese recognize independence and "desist from interference with Assam, Manipur and Cachar," "cede Rakhine and its dependencies," receive a British Resident at the Court of Ava, and pay an indemnity of two million pounds sterling. Yangon and Taninthayi would be held until the indemnity was paid.

The Court of Ava had not expected and was unwilling to accept, the full dismemberment of their western empire and the crushing penalty demanded. But with the army severely depleted, the Burmese envoy, the lord of Kawlin, replied that his government:

1. Would give up any claim to Assam and Manipur
2. Objected to the British choice for the future Manipuri raja
3. Would cede the Taninthayi coast but not Rakhine.

The British were unimpressed: "The question is not how much you will cede to us but how much we shall return to you".

== Breakdown of negotiations ==
The negotiations broke down, and the Burmese decided to fight on. In November 1825, the Burmese forces under Maha Ne Myo, mainly consisting of several Shan regiments led by their own Shan sawbwas, made a daring push to recapture Pyay and nearly succeeded. But by early December, the superior firepower of the British had won out and defeated the last-ditch effort by the Burmese.

By the beginning of 1826, the British were making steady advances towards Ava. They captured the ancient city of Pagan on 8 February, and on 16 February, the village of Yandabo, less than 50 miles or four days ' march, away from Ava.

== Signing ==
Left with little choice, the Burmese sued for peace. The Burmese king Bagyidaw sent a delegation, consisting of one American, one English and two Burmese ministers, to meet the commander of British forces, General Sir Archibald Campbell. Final negotiations were not negotiations at all. The Burmese had to agree to all British demands.

The British demanded and the Burmese agreed to:

1. Cede to the British Assam, Manipur, Tripura, Rakhine (Arakan), and Taninthayi (Tenasserim) coast south of Salween river,
2. Cease all interference in Cachar and Jaintia,
3. Pay an indemnity of one million pounds sterling in four installments,
4. Allow for an exchange of diplomatic representatives between Ava and Calcutta,,
5. Sign a commercial treaty in due course.

The first installment of indemnity was to be paid immediately, the second installment within the first 100 days of signing the treaty, and the rest within two years. Until the second installment was paid, the British would not leave Yangon.

The Treaty of Yandabo was signed by General Campbell from the British side and Governor of Legaing Maha Min Hla Kyaw Htin from the Burmese side on 24 February 1826. The Burmese paid 250,000 pounds sterling in gold and silver bullion as the first installment of the indemnity and also released British prisoners of war.

== Aftermath ==
The treaty imposed a severe financial burden on the Burmese kingdom and effectively left it crippled. The British terms in the negotiations were strongly influenced by the heavy cost in lives and money which the war had entailed. Some 40,000 British and Indians troops had been involved, of whom 15,000 had been killed. The cost to British India's finances had been almost ruinous, amounting to approximately 13 million pounds sterling. The cost of war contributed to a severe economic crisis in India, which by 1833 had bankrupted the Bengal agency houses and cost the British East India Company its remaining privileges, including the monopoly of trade to China.

Territories like Assam became a part of British India. For the Burmese, the treaty was a total humiliation and a long lasting financial burden. The world the Burmese knew, built on the back of the military success of the previous 75 years was lost, and a generation of men had been killed in battle. The Court of Ava could not come to terms with the loss of the territories and made unsuccessful attempts to get them back, while an invited British Resident in Ava was a daily reminder of the humiliation of defeat.

More importantly, the burden of indemnity would leave the royal treasury bankrupt for years. The indemnity of one million pounds sterling would have been considered a colossal sum even in Europe at the time, and it became frightening when translated into the Burmese kyat equivalent of 10 million. The cost of living of the average villager in Upper Burma in 1826 was one kyat per month.

The treaty achieved its objective: Leave Burma crippled. Indeed, the British would make two more, much easier, wars against the now much weaker Burmese in 1852 and 1885, eventually annexing the entire country by 1885.
