= Maha Ne Myo =

- မဟာနေမျိုး
- Died: 2 December 1825
- Military career
- Allegiance: Konbaung Dynasty
- Branch: Royal Burmese Army
- Service years: ?–1825
- Rank: Commander-in-chief (1825)
- Conflicts: First Anglo-Burmese War
- Awards: Maha Ne Myo

Maha Ne Myo (Burmese: မဟာနေမျိုး, pronounced [məhà nè mjó]) was a Burmese general in the royal service of King Bagyidaw of Konbaung dynasty. In the First Anglo-Burmese War, Maha Ne Myo led the Burmese forces after the death of Gen. Maha Bandula in April 1825 until his own death in the battle of Prome on 2 December 1825. His death effectively ended any expectations the Burmese had of driving out the British, and was followed by the Treaty of Yandabo in February 1826 that ended the war strictly on British terms.

== Battle of Prome ==
After Maha Bandula's death on 1 April 1825 in the battle of Danubyu, the remaining Burmese forces retreated to Upper Burma. The British, led by Gen. Archibald Campbell, took Prome (Pyay), the traditional border town between Upper Burma and Lower Burma, on 4 April 1825. The British decided to consolidate their gains in Lower Burma throughout the monsoon season.

Peace negotiations that began in September broke down by early October after the Burmese would not agree to British terms. The British had demanded no less than the complete dismemberment of the Burmese western territories in Arakan, Assam, Manipur and the Tenasserim coast as well as two million pounds sterling of indemnity. The Burmese would not agree to give up Arakan and the large sum of indemnity.

In November 1825, the Burmese decided to throw everything they had in a one last-ditch effort. Starting in mid-November, the Burmese forces, consisted mainly of Shan regiments led by their sawbwas, threatened Prome in a daring circular movement that almost surrounded the town and cut off communications lines to Yangon. In the end, the superior firepower of the British guns and missiles won out. On 1 December, Gen. Campbell, with 2500 European and 1500 Indian sepoys, supported by a flotilla of gun boats, attacked the main Burmese position outside Prome. On 2 December, Maha Ne Myo was killed by a shell launched from the flotilla. After Maha Ne Myo's death, the British dislodged the Burmese by 5 December.

The defeat in Prome effectively left the Burmese army in disarray. The Burmese army was in constant retreat from then on. By February 1826, the Burmese were forced to accept the British terms to end the war.
