= Yandabo =

Yandabo ရန္တပို
- Village
- Location within Myanmar
- Coordinates: 21°38′15″N 95°21′52″E
- Country: Burma
- Region: Mandalay Region
- District: Myingyan District
- Township: Myingyan Township
- Village: Yandabo
- Time zone: UTC+6:30 (MMT)

Yandabo is a village on the Irrawaddy River in Myingyan Township, central Burma. The Treaty of Yandabo which ended the First Anglo-Burmese War (1824–1826), was signed here on 24 February 1826. Today, the village is noted for its pottery industry.
