= Sir Archibald Campbell, 1st Baronet =

British army officer

General Sir Archibald Campbell GCB Bt
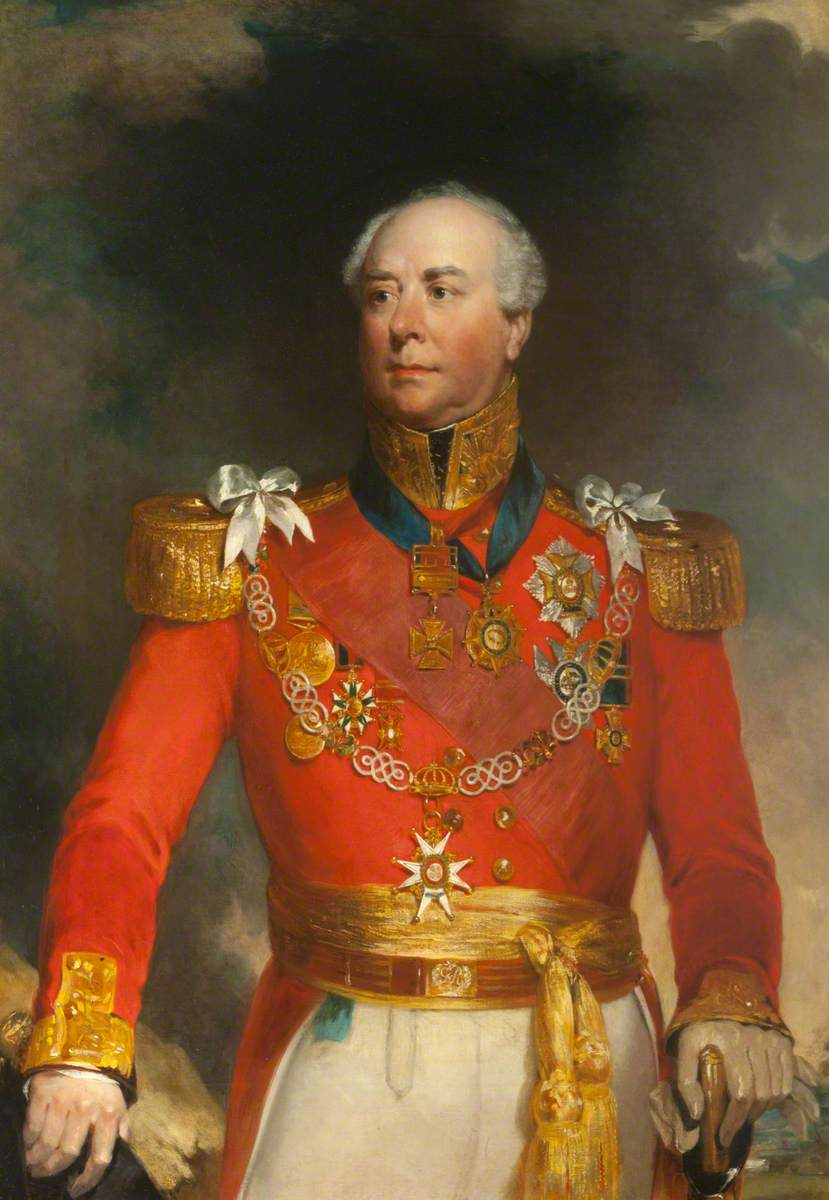
- Portrait by John Wood
- Born: 12 March 1769; Glen Lyon
- Died: 6 October 1843 (aged 74); Edinburgh
- Burial place: St John's, Edinburgh
- Education: Tonbridge School
- Military career
- Allegiance: United Kingdom
- Branch: British Army; Portuguese Army
- Service years: 1787–1843 (Britain); 1813–1820 (Portugal)
- Rank: General (Britain); Major-General (Portugal)
- Commands: 71st Regiment of Foot; 6th Portuguese Infantry Regiment; 38th Regiment of Foot
- Conflicts: Third Anglo-Mysore War; Siege of Seringapatam; French Revolutionary Wars; Fourth Anglo-Mysore War; Siege of Seringapatam; Napoleonic Wars; Peninsular War; Battle of Roliça; Battle of Vimeiro; Battle of Corunna; Battle of Busaco; Battle of Arroyo dos Molinos; Battle of Albuera; Battle of Vitoria; Battle of the Pyrenees; Battle of Nivelle; Battle of the Nive; First Anglo-Burmese War; Battle of Yangon; Battle of Danubyu; Battle of Prome
- Awards: Army Gold Cross; Military Order of the Tower and Sword (Portugal); Maha Thura Nawratha (Burma)

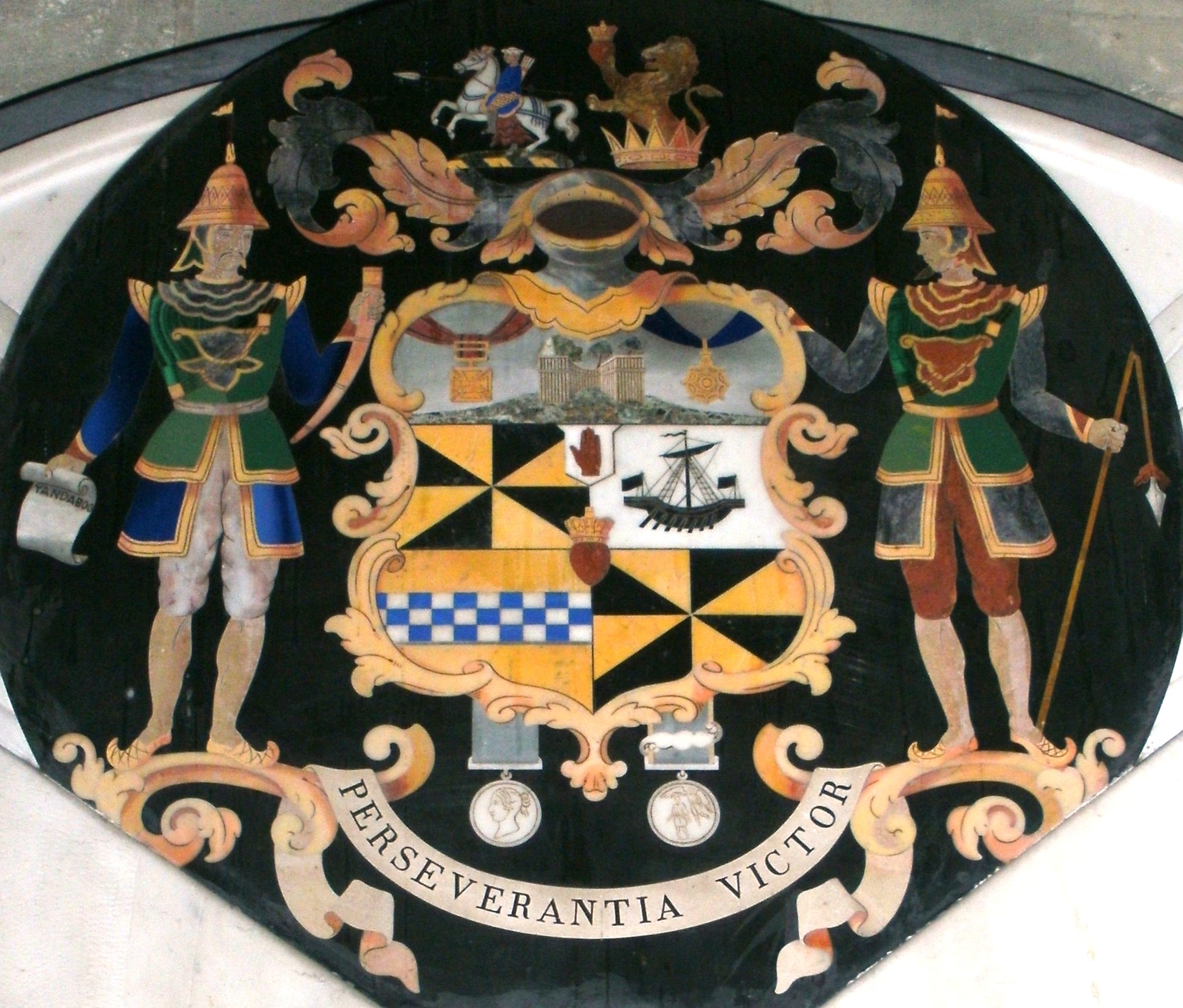
Heraldic achievement of the Campbell Baronets of Nova Scotia, as displayed on the memorial of Major General Sir John Campbell, 2nd Baronet (1807–1855) in Winchester Cathedral.

Sir Archibald Campbell, 1st Baronet, GCB (12 March 1769 – 6 October 1843) was a British army officer. From 1824 to 1826, Gen. Campbell commanded the British forces in the First Anglo-Burmese War, the longest and most expensive war in British Indian history, that gave the British control of Assam, Manipur, Cachar, Jaintia, Arakan and Tenasserim. He became known as the "Hero of Ava". From 1831 to 1837, he was the administrator of the colony of New Brunswick, Canada. The Canadian city of Campbellton in the province of New Brunswick was named in his honour.

== Early life ==
Archibald was born on 12 March 1769 at Glen Lyon, Perthshire, and educated at Tonbridge School, Kent, England. He was the third son of Captain Archibald Campbell and his wife Margaret Small of Dirnanean, daughter of Captain James Small, factor of the forfeited estates of the Robertsons of Struan. Archibald was a descendant of the Robertsons through his maternal great-grandmother, Magdalen Robertson, and also through his paternal grandmother, Janet Robertson. Archibald's great-grandfather on his father's side, Duncan Campbell 2nd Laird of Duneaves, Perthshire, was a first cousin of Robert Campbell, 5th of Glenlyon. One of Archibald's maternal great-uncles was Major-General John Small who fought in the American Revolutionary War and later became Lieutenant Governor of Guernsey. Archibald grew up at Carie, formerly part of the Robertson estate on the south shore of Loch Rannoch within the parish of Logierait.

== Military career ==
=== Early career ===
Campbell entered the army aged 18, in 1787 as an ensign. The next year he and his regiment, the 77th Regiment of Foot, left for India, where he took part in the campaign against Tipu Sultan in 1790. In 1791 he was promoted to Lieutenant. He served in the Mysore campaign and the first siege of Seringapatam.

In 1795 his regiment was ordered to reduce the Dutch garrison (Fort Stormsburg) of Cochin on the coast of Malabar. In 1799 he took part of the reduction of the island of Ceylon.

Later in 1799 he purchased the rank of captain in the 67th but exchanged into the 88th so that he could continue with his foreign service. However, he was required by ill-health to return home in 1801. He was appointed major in the 6th battalion of reserve, stationed in Guernsey.

He moved in 1805 to the 1st battalion which was leaving for Portugal. He fought in the battles of Roliça, Vimeiro and Corunna. In 1809 he was promoted to lieutenant-colonel and assisted General Beresford in organising the Portuguese army. In that capacity he was made full colonel and then brigadier. He was present through most of the fighting in the Peninsula.

In 1813 Campbell was appointed to the rank of major-general in the Portuguese army. In 1816 he was given command of the Lisbon division. He returned to the service of Britain in 1820, after a revolution in Portugal. Campbell was appointed colonel of the 38th Regiment of Foot (in which post he was succeeded by Field Marshal Sir John Forster FitzGerald, GCB) and went to India with it. For his Peninsula service, Campbell was awarded the Army Gold Cross with one clasp for the battles of Albuera, Vitoria, the Pyrenees, the Nivelle, and the Nive.

=== First Anglo-Burmese War (1824–1826) ===
==== Battle of Yangon (May–December 1824) ====
In India, General Campbell was directed to take command of an expedition against the Burmese in the First Anglo-Burmese War. In May 1824, he led a British naval force of over 10,000 men (5000 British soldiers and over 5000 Indian sepoys) to Yangon (Rangoon), and took the deserted city with little resistance on 11 May 1824. After fortifying the Shwedagon Pagoda compound, Campbell launched attacks on Burmese lines, and by July 1824, had successfully pushed the Burmese towards Kamayut, 5 miles (8.0 km) from the Shwedagon, then successfully repelled Burmese efforts to retake the city in September.

In December 1824, Campbell and his 10,000 men decisively defeated the 15,000 strong Burmese forces led by General Maha Bandula in the final battle of Yangon. Thousands of Burmese soldiers were cut down under British gunfire and exploding Congreve rocket fire. Only 7000 of the 15,000 survived. The Burmese retreated to their rear base at Danubyu in the Irrawaddy Delta, 60 miles (97 km) from Yangon.

==== Occupation of Lower Burma (March–December 1825) ====
In late March 1825, Campbell ordered a 4000 strong British force, supported by a flotilla of gun boats, to take Danubyu. The fort, defended by 10,000 Burmese, fell after Bandula was killed by a mortar shell on 1 April 1825. After Danubyu, the British forces took Pyay (Prome), the traditional boundary between Upper and Lower Burma, and went on to consolidate gains in Lower Burma throughout the monsoon season of 1825.

In November and December 1825, Campbell's forces, consisted of 2500 British and 1500 Indian sepoys, successfully repelled the last-ditch efforts by the Burmese forces led by their new commander-in-chief General Maha Ne Myo to retake Pyay.

==== March to Upper Burma and Victory (January–February 1826) ====
With the Burmese army in disarray, Campbell marched north to Upper Burma, and took the ancient capital of Pagan (Bagan) in early February 1826. After Campbell's forces took the village of Yandabo, about 50 miles (80 km) from the capital Ava (Innwa), on 16 February, the Burmese finally agreed to full British demands "without discussion". As the chief commander of British forces, Campbell was the lead signatory of the Treaty of Yandabo on the British side. The Burmese agreed to cede to the British Assam, Manipur, Arakan and Tenasserim; stop all interference in Cachar and Jaintia; and pay an indemnity of one million pounds sterling.

The treaty ended the longest and most expensive war in British Indian history. Fifteen thousand European and Indian soldiers died, together with an unknown (but almost certainly higher) number of Burmese. The campaign cost the British five million pounds sterling (roughly 18.5 billion in 2006 dollars) to 13 million pounds sterling that led to a severe economic crisis in British India in 1833.

==== After the war ====
Campbell received the thanks of Parliament, the governor-in-council and the British East India Company gave him a gold medal and a pension of £1000 per annum for life. The Burmese Court also gave him an honorary military title as sign of friendship "Maha Thura Nawratha", a title generally associated with a commander of the Royal Elephant Corp. In 1839 he was made Commander-in-chief in Bombay but did not enjoy the post for long due to ill-health.

== Lieutenant-governor ==
Campbell returned to England in 1829 and was given the colonelcy of the 95th (Derbyshire) Regiment of Foot (1828–1834). In 1831 he was made Lieutenant Governor of New Brunswick, where he stayed for six years (1831–1837). Campbell was concerned for the safety of New Brunswick. For this reason he began the construction of a road, known as the "Royal Road", from Fredericton to Grand Falls, so as to improve the movement of troops into the northern part of the colony where the Americans had become a threat. The Canadian city of Campbellton in the province of New Brunswick was named in his honour.

In 1834 he transferred as Colonel to the 77th (East Middlesex) Regiment of Foot and in 1840 transferred again to be Colonel of the 62nd (Wiltshire) Regiment of Foot, holding the latter post until his death in 1843 at age 74.

== Family ==
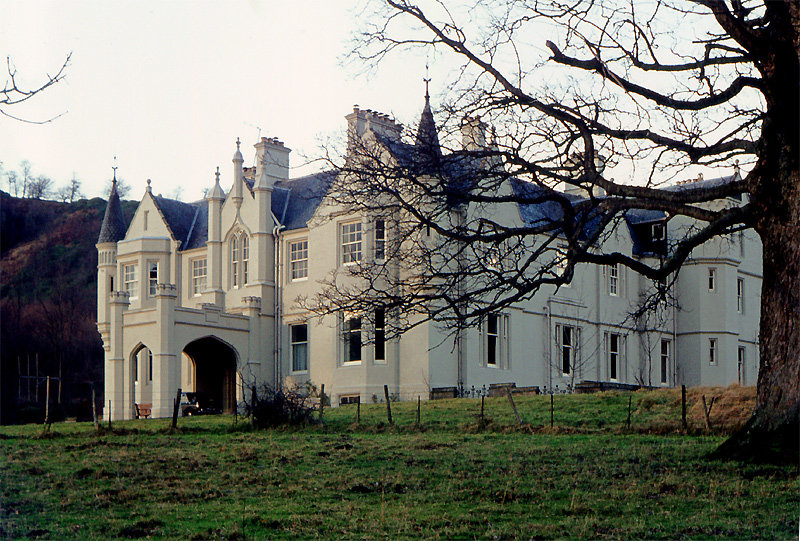
Garth House, Fortingall. The home of Sir Archibald and Lady Helen (MacDonald) Campbell

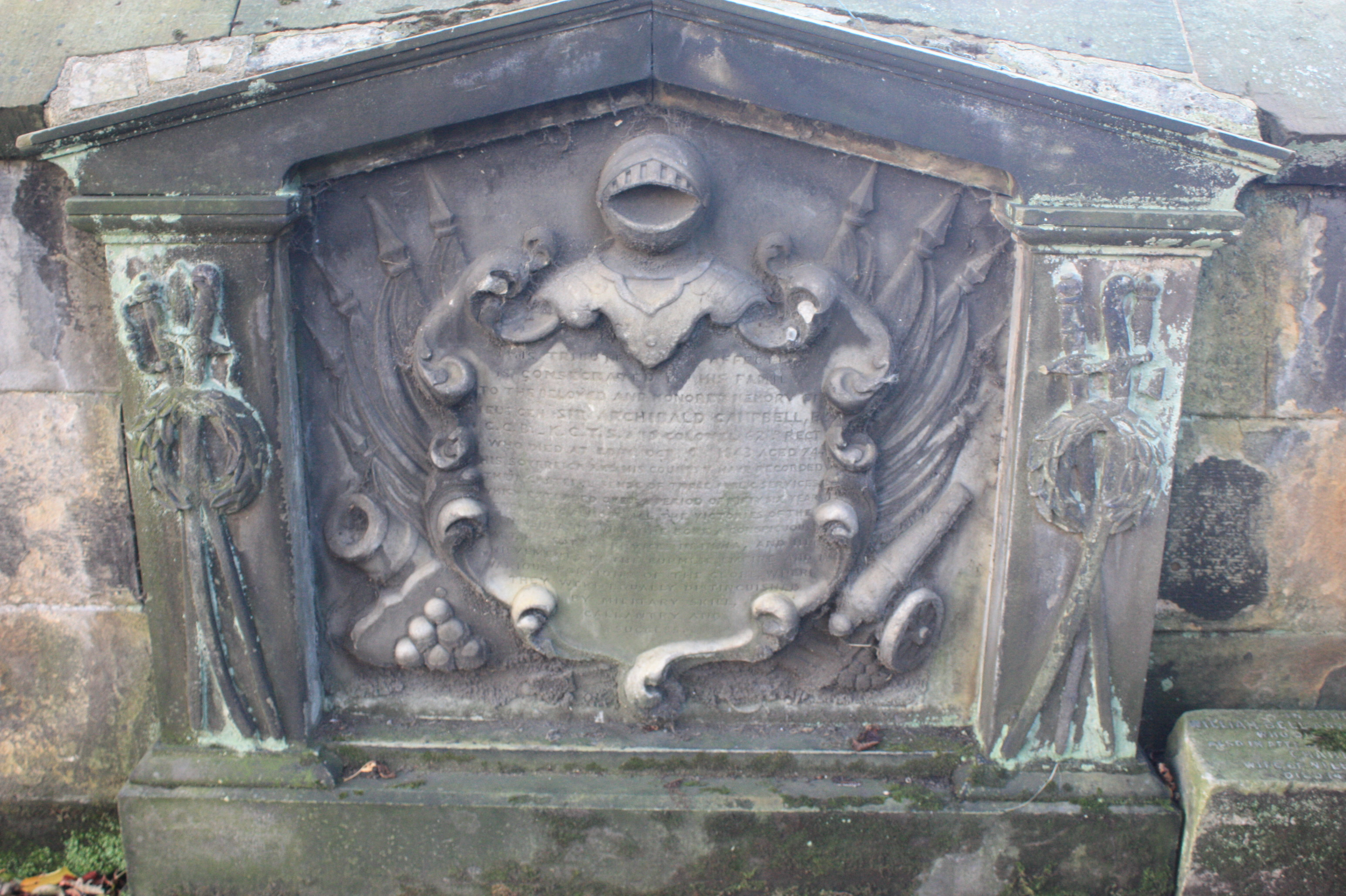
The grave of Gen Sir Archibald Campbell, St Johns, Edinburgh

Archibald Campbell married Helen MacDonald, a sister of John MacDonald of Garth, on 6 July 1801 at Marylebone, London. She was also the sister of Mrs William McGillivray, née Magdalen MacDonald. The Campbells were the parents of two sons and three daughters. Archibald Campbell and his wife both spoke Gaelic. The family's primary residence was Garth House near Fortingall, Perthshire, Scotland.

One of his sons-in-law was his aide-de-camp, Lt. Col John James Snodgrass. Another son-in-law was General The Hon. Sir Augustus Almeric Spencer, G.C.B., a member of the Spencer family and Commander-in-Chief of the Bombay Army between 1869 and 1875. One of Spencer's grandsons was the Reverend Canon Henry Spencer Stephenson, Chaplain to King George VI and Queen Elizabeth II.

Granddaughter Laura Augusta Mackenzie Douglas married Donald Mackenzie the son of Donald Mackenzie, stylised Lord Mackenzie, a Senator of the College of Justice, Edinburgh, Scotland. A second granddaughter, Helen Maria Mackenzie Douglas, married another of Mackenzie's sons, Andrew Mitchell Mackenzie.

After his service in Bombay, Campbell retired to private life. He died in Edinburgh on 6 October 1843, and was buried in the churchyard of the Church of St John the Evangelist, Edinburgh. He is buried on one of the southern terraces, at its western end.

Sir Archibald's son, Sir John Campbell, 2nd Baronet succeeded to the baronetcy upon his death.

== Decorations ==
Ribbon	Description	Notes
	Commander of the Portuguese Order of the Tower and Sword	Knight level on 1813; (Portugal)
Knight Bachelor Ribbon	Knight Bachelor	Decoration awarded on 1814
Medal Ribbon of the Order of the Bath	Order of the Bath	Knight level on 1815; Knight Grand Cross level on 1826
	Baronet Campbell of New Brunswick	Awarded on 1831

Baronetage of the United Kingdom
New creation	Baronet (of New Brunswick); 1831–1843	Succeeded by Sir John Campbell
Military offices
Preceded by Sir Frederick Augustus Wetherall	62nd (Wiltshire) Regiment of Foot; 1840–1843	Succeeded by Sir John Forster FitzGerald
Preceded by Sir George Cooke	77th (East Middlesex) Regiment of Foot; 1834–1840	Succeeded by Sir John Macleod
