= Battle of Danubyu =

- Part of the First Anglo-Burmese War
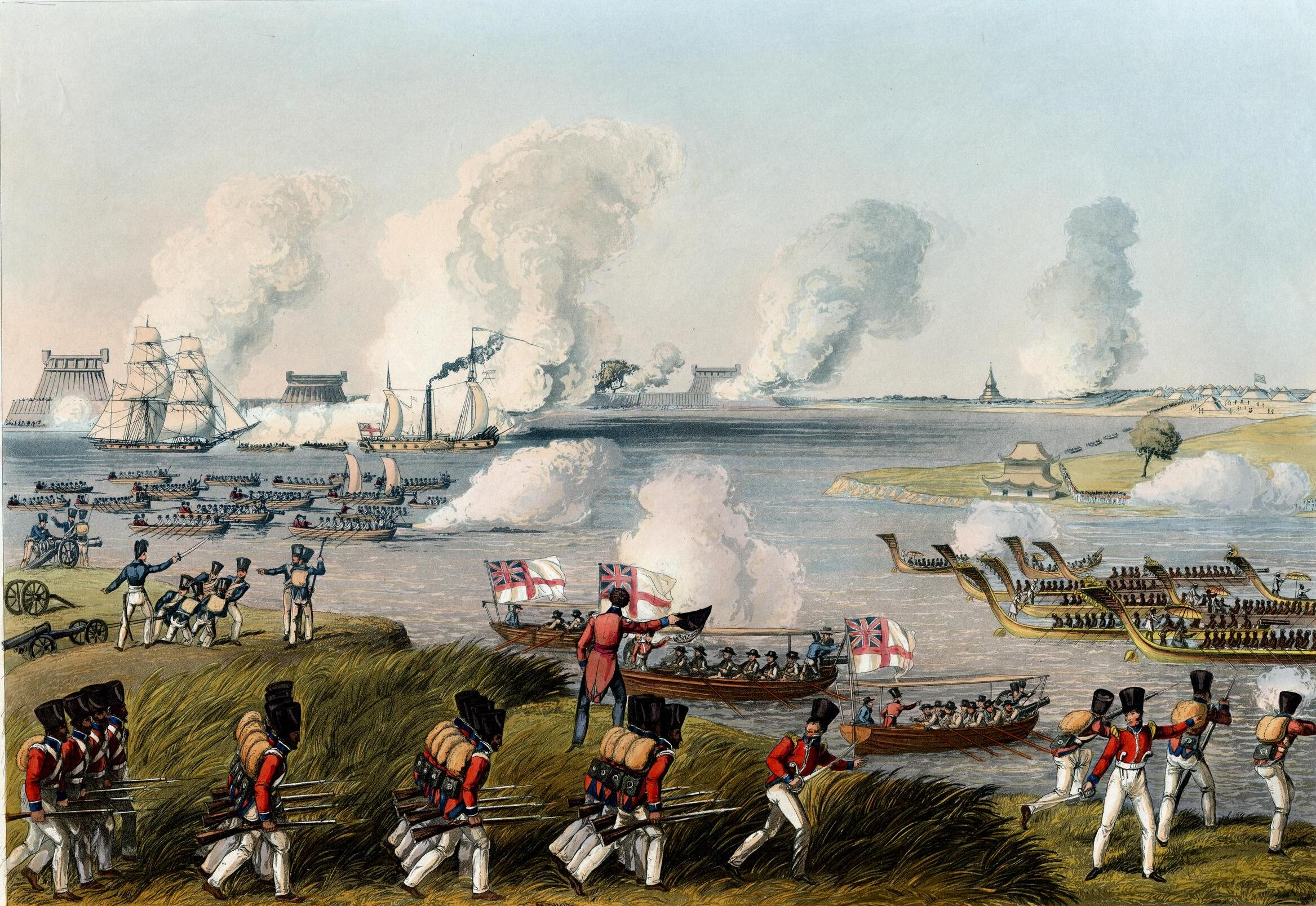
- The Combined Forces under Brig. Cotton, C.B. and Captains Alexander, C.B. & Chads, R.N. passing the Fortress of Donabue to effect a junction with Sir Archibald Campbell, on 27 March 1825
Date	March 1825 – April 1825
Location	Danubyu, Ayeyarwady, Burma
Result	British victory

Belligerents
(United Kingdom of Great Britain and Ireland) British Empire	(Konbaung dynasty) Burmese Empire

Commanders and leaders
(United Kingdom of Great Britain and Ireland) Sir Archibald Campbell (United Kingdom of Great Britain and Ireland) Willoughby Cotton	Maha Bandula †

Strength
4,000	10,000

Casualties and losses
257 killed or wounded	800 killed or wounded

The Battle of Danubyu took place between the British Empire and the Konbaung Dynasty as part of the First Anglo-Burmese War.

== Prelude ==
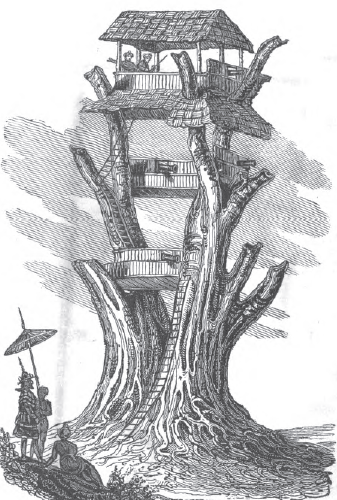
Bandula's lookout tree at Danybyu, mounted with four guns

After the defeat of the Burmese army in the Battle of Yangon (1824), Maha Bandula retreated the Burmese army back to his rear base at Danubyu, a small town not far from Yangon, in the Irrawaddy delta. Having lost experienced men in Yangon, the Burmese forces now numbered about 10,000, of mixed quality, including some of the king's best soldiers but also many untrained and barely armed conscripts. The stockade itself stretched one mile (1.6 km) along the riverbank, and was made up of solid teak beams no less than 15 feet (4.6 m) high.

The British force consisted of 4,000 men including a cavalry force from the Governor General's Bodyguard supported by a flotilla of gunboats. 800 men were European troops from the British Army's 47th and 98th Regiments and the Madras European Regiment.

== Battle ==
In March 1825, the British opened the battle with a major attack under heavy artillery fire. The initial British strategy under General Cotton was to attack each section of the stockade in succession. Some 600 men attacked the first section of the stockade close to a "White Pagoda". After some heavy close quarter fighting, the British drove off the Burmese from the first section. Hoping to pressure the Burmese, General Cotton then ordered 200 men of the 89th Regiment and the Madras European Regiment under Lieutenant Colonel Mallet to attack the second section of the stockade. They once again attacked at the point of a bayonet under the covering fire from British artillery but the Burmese had been ready and unleashed a devastating musketry that destroyed the attack. Captain Frederick Doveton described the casualties from the Burmese fusillade, "one-half of our men having fallen ere they could reach the works, and two valuable officers of H.M. 89th, Captains Rose and Cannon, having been killed." Out of the 200 men, over 130 were killed or wounded. Rather than continue forward, the British withdrew, abandoning both captured defenses.

With the British retreating, Bandula attempted to break the siege leading out sorties with foot soldiers, cavalry, and 17 fighting elephants. But the elephants were stopped by rocket fire and the cavalry found it impossible to move against the sustained British artillery fire.

On 1 April, the British launched a major attack, pounding down on the town with their heavy guns and raining their rockets on every part of the Burmese line. Bandula was killed by a mortar shell. Bandula had walked around the fort to boost the morale of his men, he stood out in his full insignia under a glittering golden umbrella, disregarding the warnings of his generals that he would prove an easy target for the enemy's guns. After Bandula's death, the Burmese evacuated Danubyu.

== Aftermath ==
=== Casualties ===
The British suffered around 250 killed or wounded with around 7 officers dead where at least 130 were from the initial attack on Burmese positions at Danubyu. The Burmese losses were unknown but were suspected to suffer at most 800 killed or wounded.
