= Battle of Yangon (1824) =

- Part of the First Anglo-Burmese War
Date	11 May 1824 – 15 December 1824 (7 months, 4 days)
Location	Yangon, Burma 16°47′42″N 96°09′36″E
Result	British victory

Belligerents
(United Kingdom of Great Britain and Ireland) British Empire	Konbaung Dynasty

Commanders and leaders
(United Kingdom of Great Britain and Ireland) Archibald Campbell	Bagyidaw; Maha Bandula; Thado Uzana

Strength
10,000	16,000

Casualties and losses
540 killed or wounded 1,200 died of disease	6,000 killed, wounded, or captured 3,000 fled

The Battle of Yangon (1824), also called the Battle of Rangoon, was a military engagement fought between the British Empire and the Konbaung Dynasty of Burma. It resulted in a great victory for the British forces led by Archibald Campbell.

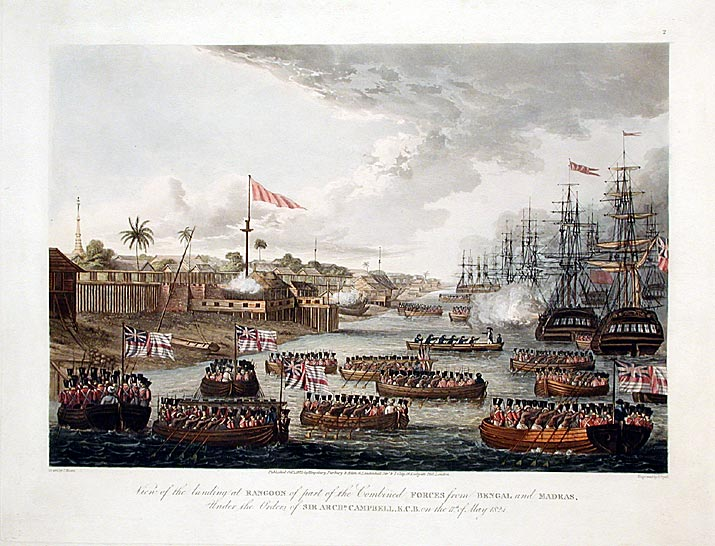
British naval force entered the harbour of Yangon (Rangoon) in May 1824

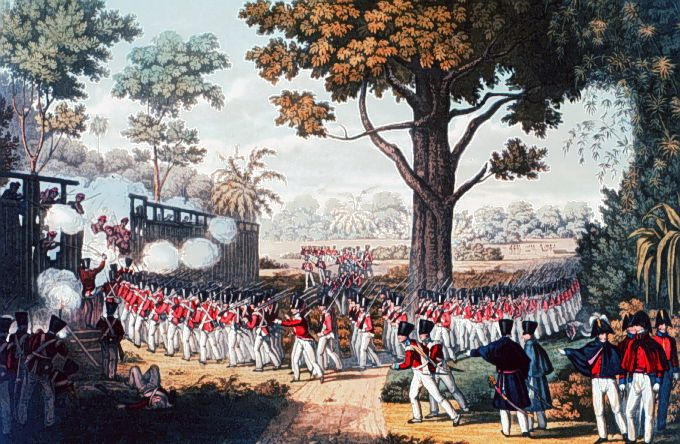
The Storming of the Lesser Stockade at Kemmendine near Yangon (Rangoon) on 10 June 1824

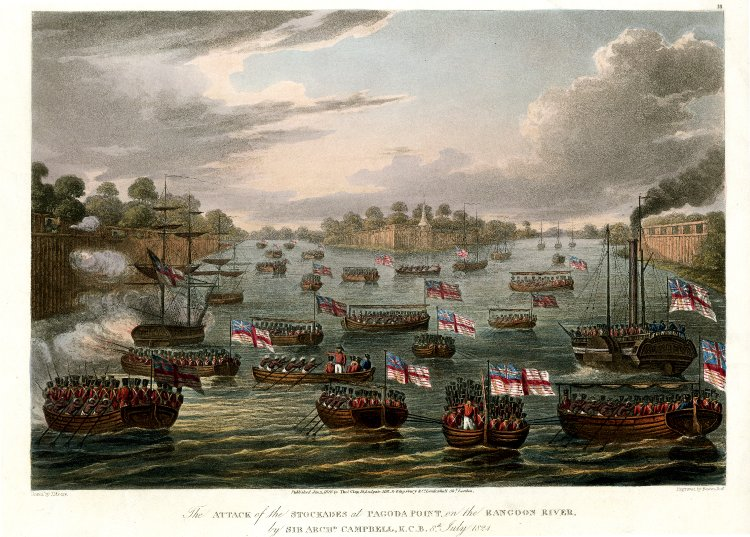
The Attack of the Stockades at Pagoda Point, on the Rangoon River, 8 July 1824

== The Battle ==
Instead of fighting in hard terrain, the British took the fight to Burma proper. On 11 May 1824, a British naval force of 10,000 men (5,000 British soldiers and over 5,000 Indian sepoys) entered the harbour of Yangon (Rangoon), taking the Burmese by surprise. The Burmese, pursuing a scorched earth policy, left the empty city behind and chose to fortify positions along an east–west 10-mile (16 km) arc outside the city. The British forces led by General Archibald Campbell took positions inside the Shwedagon Pagoda compound, which was promptly fortified. The British launched attacks on the Burmese lines and, by July 1824, had successfully pushed the Burmese towards Kamayut, five miles (8 km) from Shwedagon. Burmese efforts to retake Shwedagon in September failed.

King Bagyidaw ordered a near-complete withdrawal from the western front—Bandula from Arakan and Bengal, and Uzana from Assam, Cachar, and Jaintia to meet the British in Yangon. In August, in the midst of monsoon season, Bandula and his army crossed the Arakan Yoma. Moving tens of thousands of men over the 3,000-foot-high Arakan hills, or 10,000-foot-high Assamese ranges, heavily forested with only narrow footpaths and open to attack by tigers and leopards, would have been difficult even in mild weather conditions. The King later granted both Bandula and Uzana the title Agga Maha Thenapati (Sanskrit: Aggramahāsenāpati) equivalent to Field Marshal, the highest possible military rank. Bandula was also made the governor of Sittaung.

By November, Bandula commanded a large army outside Yangon. There is great disparancy of the numbers ranging from 30,000 to 60,000 (mostly from British sources). Terrance Blackburn had discussed the numbers, and felt that Campbell had exaggerated the Burmese numbers in his reports to imply that the British only needed a few to vanquish a vast horde sent against them. According to the Burmese royal chronicles, the number was around 16,000.

Bandula believed that he could take the British force head-on. Although the Burmese were numerically superior, only around half the army were musketeers, with the rest bring armed with spears and swords. The Burmese cannons fired only balls, whereas the British cannons fired exploding shells. Unbeknown to him, the British had just received the first shipment of Congreve rockets, a new weapon which the Burmese had never seen before. More ominously for the Burmese, the speedy march through the hilly regions of Rakhine Yoma and Assamese ranges had left their troops exhausted.

On 30 November, in what turned out be the biggest mistake of his career, Bandula ordered a frontal attack on British positions. The British, with their superior weaponry, withstood several Burmese charges at the Shwedagon fort, cutting down men by the thousands. By 7 December, the British troops, supported by rocket fire, began to gain the upper hand. On 15 December, the Burmese were driven out of their last remaining stronghold at Kokine.

In the end, only 7,000 of the 16,000 Burmese soldiers returned to the royal army. Campbell's despatches stated the Burmese suffered some 6,000 casualties over the 15 day battle. The rest of the Burmese army, most of them conscripts, fled and returned to their homes. The British losses were considered heavy in proportion as well: 40 officers and 500 other ranks were killed or wounded in combat with a much larger number, around 1,200, ill from disease.
