= First Anglo-Burmese War =

1824–1826 war in Southeast Asia

First Anglo-Burmese War ပထမအင်္ဂလိပ်-မြန်မာစစ်
- Part of the Anglo-Burmese Wars
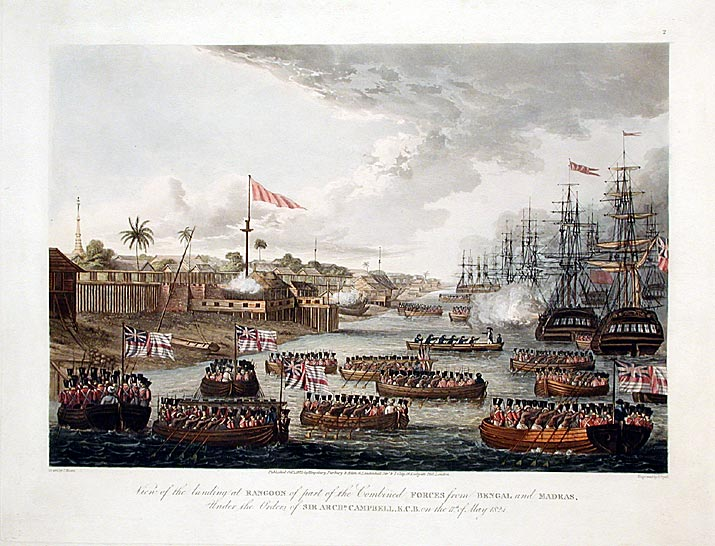
- The British launched an amphibious assault on Rangoon on 11 May 1824.
| Date | 5 March 1824 – 24 February 1826 (1 year, 11 months, 2 weeks, and 5 days) |
| Location | Burma, East Bengal, Assam, Manipur, Cachar and Jaintia |
| Result | Pyrrhic British victory * Treaty of Yandabo |
| Territorial changes | Burma cedes Assam, Arakan and Tavoy (Tenasserim); loses influence in Cachar and Jaintia; pays one million pound sterling in indemnity, Manipur gains independence. |

Belligerents
| British Empire; East India Company; Co-belligerent: Siam | Burmese Empire; Shan States; Allied Kachin Tribes |

Commanders and leaders
| William Amherst (United Kingdom of Great Britain and Ireland) Edward Paget (United Kingdom of Great Britain and Ireland) Archibald Campbell (United Kingdom of Great Britain and Ireland) Joseph Morrison # (United Kingdom of Great Britain and Ireland) Charles Grant # (United Kingdom of Great Britain and Ireland) Frederick Marryat; Co-belligerent: Rama III; Chaophraya Mahayotha; Phraya Surasena; Phraya Chumphon | Bagyidaw; Tharrawaddy Min; Maha Bandula †; Maha Ne Myo †; Myawaddy U Sa; Duwa Daihpa Gam; Minkyaw Thura |

Units involved
| (East India Company) Presidency armies (British Empire) Royal Regiments (East India Company) Presidency Navies (United Kingdom of Great Britain and Ireland) Royal Navy; Co-belligerent: (Rattanakosin Kingdom (1782–1932)) Royal Siamese Army | (Konbaung dynasty) Royal Burmese Army; Allied Kachin and Shan Regiments; Allied Assamese and Manipuri levies |

Strength
| British Indian Army: 40,000 (deployed) 220,000 to 260,000 in India; British Navy: 88 vessels Siamese Army: 20,000 | Burmese Army: 30,000; Burmese Navy: 500 war boats Allies: 10,000 |

Casualties and losses
| Total: ~23,000; 3,000 killed 12,000 died from disease 8,000 wounded | Unknown |

The First Anglo-Burmese War (Burmese: ပထမအင်္ဂလိပ်-မြန်မာစစ်; [pətʰəma̰ ɪ́ɰ̃ɡəleiʔ-mjəmà sɪʔ]; 5 March 1824 – 24 February 1826), also known as the First Burma War in English language accounts and First English Invasion War (Burmese: ပထမအင်္ဂလိပ်ကျူးကျော်စစ်) in Burmese language accounts, was the first of three wars fought between the British and Burmese empires in the 19th century. The war, which began primarily over the control of what is now Northeastern India, ended in a costly but decisive British victory, giving the British total control of Assam, Cachar, Manipur and Jaintia as well as Arakan Province and Tenasserim. The Burmese submitted to a British demand to pay an indemnity of one million pounds sterling, and signed a commercial treaty.

The war was one of the most expensive in British Indian history. 15,000 British soldiers died, together with an unknown number of Burmese military and civilian casualties. The high cost of the campaign to the British, 5–13 million pounds sterling (£400 million – £1.11 billion as of 2025) contributed to a severe economic crisis in British India which cost the East India Company its remaining privileges.

Although once strong enough to threaten the interests of the British East India Company (especially with respect to the eastern border regions of Assam, Manipur, and Arakan), the Burmese Empire now suffered "the beginning of the end" of its status as an independent nation. They would be economically burdened for years to come by the cost of the indemnity. The British, eventually waging the Second and Third Anglo-Burmese Wars against a much-weakened Burma, would assume control of the entire country by 1885.

== Causes ==
Tension between the British and Burmese empires were growing since the British acquisition of Bengal and the Konbaung annexation of Arakan. By 1820s, Burmese expansion into Manipur and Assam and its "forward policy" of probing into the hill states of Jaintia and Cachar, had put pressure on British Bengal as defeated forces of these states often used British India as a base of operations against the Burmese and Burmese counter-attacks would lead to clashes between British border guards and Konbaung governors' forces. Calcutta feared Burmese expansion while Ava was worried that the Company would sponsored British friendly rebels in Manipur, Assam and Arakan against the Konbaung Dynasty. By 1822, Calcutta unilaterally declared Cachar and Jaintia British protectorates and sent in troops. Despite these early conflicts, both King Bayidaw and Governor-General Lord William Amherst, 1st Earl Amherst were hesitant about the escalation of hostilities but were pressured by pro-war factions on both sides. Amherst was a former diplomat to China and believed that British interference in the regional of balance of power would draw British India into a messy conflict in Southeast Asia, namely the deadlock between the kingdoms of Burma, Siam and Vietnam. On the other hand, Bagyidaw, while eager to gain glory, was more interested in non-martial activities and enjoying trade interactions with Europeans and were more militarily focused on their traditional rival Siam. Furthermore, the Burmese were aware of the military might the British had garnered from Mysorean and Maratha exiles who encouraged war against the British. He was eager to keep the peace with the British in India despite provocation from his other Ministers and Governors particularly led by Queen Me Nu, who held considerable influence.

The cross-border raids into these newly acquired territories from British territories and expanding spheres of influence began to vexed the Burmese. Convinced that war was inevitable, Burmese commander-in-chief Maha Bandula, described by the English resident in the Court as "the Wellington of the army" became the main proponent of an offensive policy against the British. Bandula was part of the war party at Bagyidaw's court, which also included Queen Me Nu and her brother, the Lord of Salin. Bandula believed that a decisive victory could allow Ava to consolidate its gains in its new western empire in Arakan, Manipur, Assam, Cachar, and Jaintia, as well as take over eastern Bengal.

In September 1823, the casus belli was British and Burmese forces clashing to claim Shalpuri Island near Chittagong. The Burmese considered the British sepoys raising their flag as a provocation and were warned by the Konbaung Governor of Arakan, Maha Mingyi Kyawswa that the British were on Burmese territory as part of Konbaung Arakan and refusual to leave would lead to war. When the British ignored him, Kyawswa's troops attacked and drove out the sepoys. The British considered the island as their as part of British Bengal and the attack as unprovoked and Burmese occupation as war.

In January 1824, Burma sent one of their top generals, Thado Thiri Maha Uzana, into Cachar and Jaintia to disperse the rebels. The British sent in their own force to meet the Burmese in Cachar, resulting in the first clashes between the two. The war formally broke out on 5 March 1824, following border clashes in Arakan.

The British reason for the war was, in addition to expanding British Bengal's sphere of influence, the desire for new markets for British manufacturing. The British were also anxious to deny the French the use of Burmese harbours and concerned about French influence at the Court of Ava, as the kingdom was still known to them. British Ambassador Michael Symes's mission was equipped to gain as much knowledge as possible of the country for future British plans whereas previous envoys were concerned principally with trade concessions.

Anglo-French rivalry had already played a role during Alaungpaya's endeavours of unifying the kingdom. The Burmese in these wars were advancing into smaller states not ruled by the British or the subject of expansionist goals by the British before the war began, and the British were not so much preoccupied by the refugee problem initially as by the threat posed by the French until further incidents forced their hand. Peers also stated that the British military establishment in India was simply eager to fight after several years of military victories in the last decade against Napoleon and the Marathas.

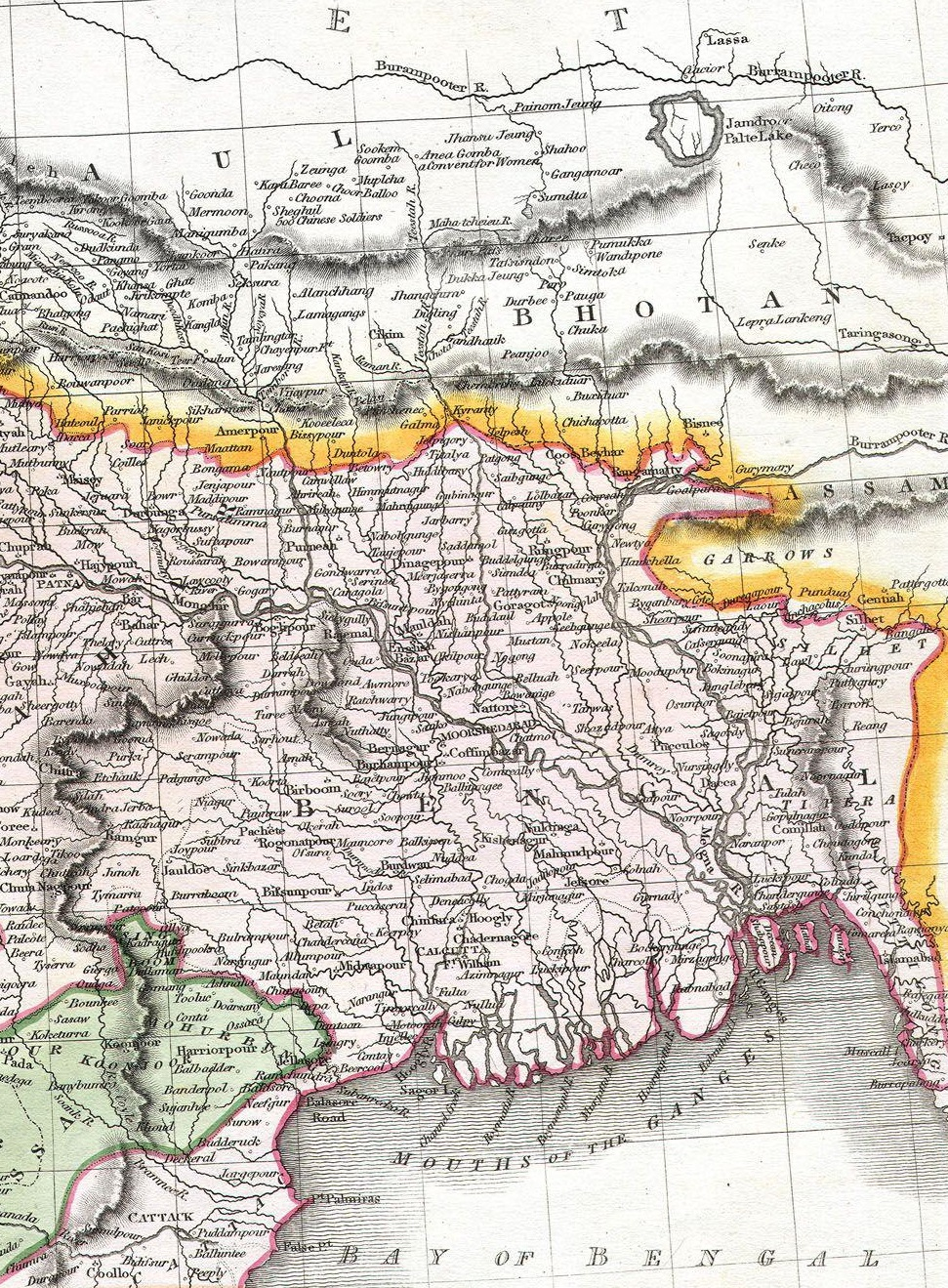
Borders of British Bengal in 1814

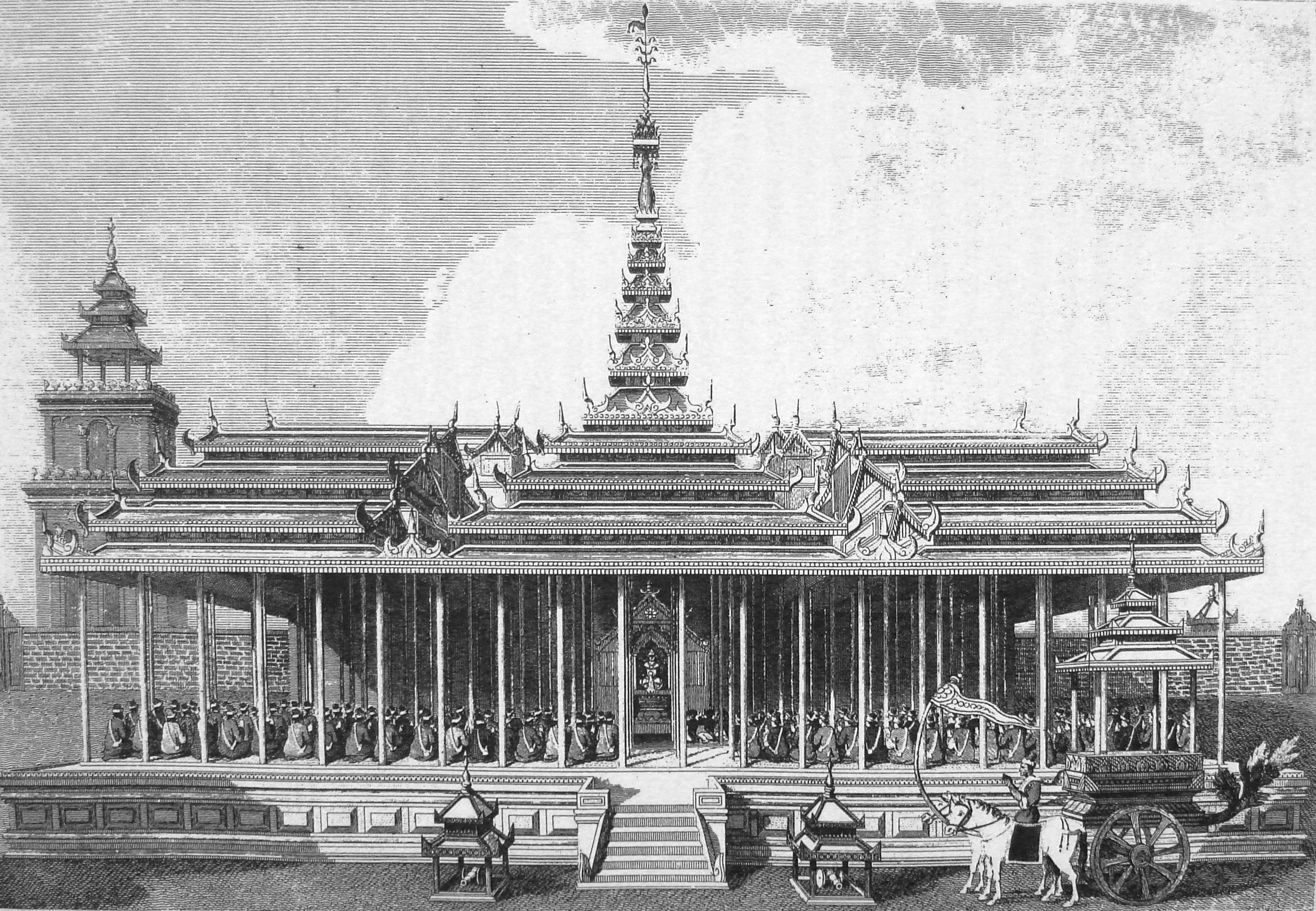
Embassy of Michael Symes to King Bodawpaya at Amarapura in 1795

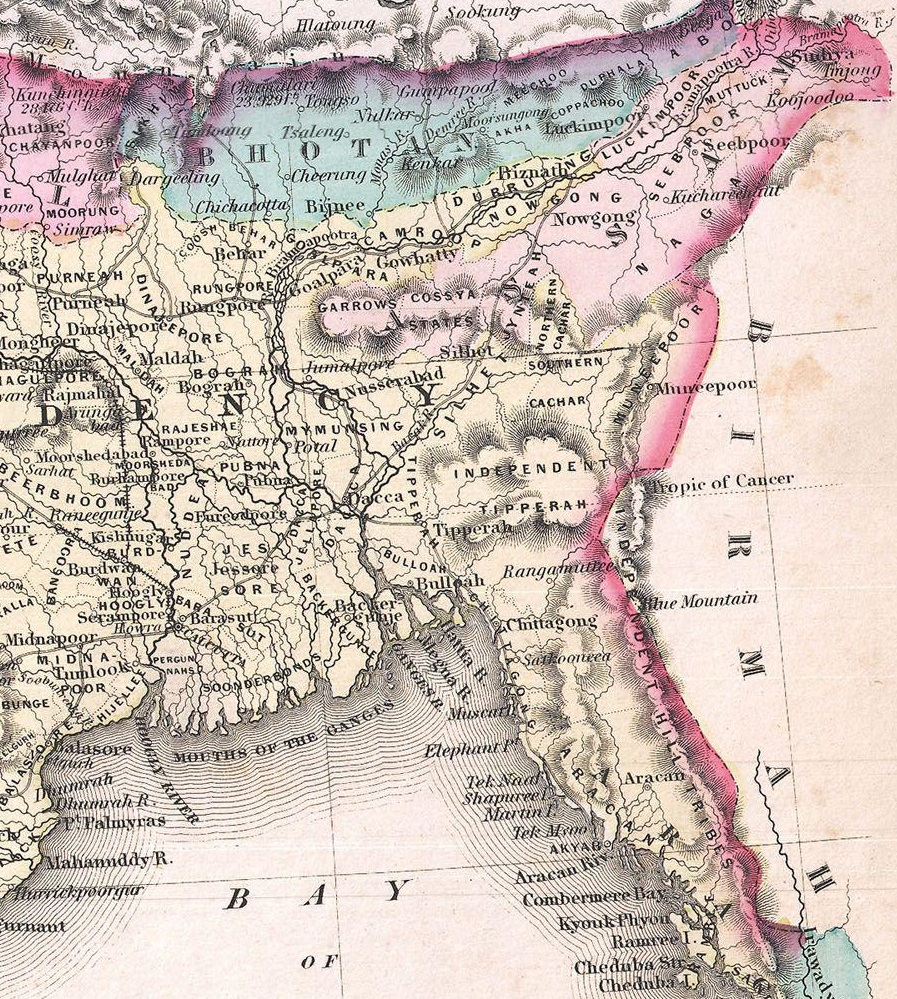
New territories added through the war (1855 map)

A British depiction of Bagyidaw purportedly ordering his troops to wrest Bengal from the East India Company

== War ==
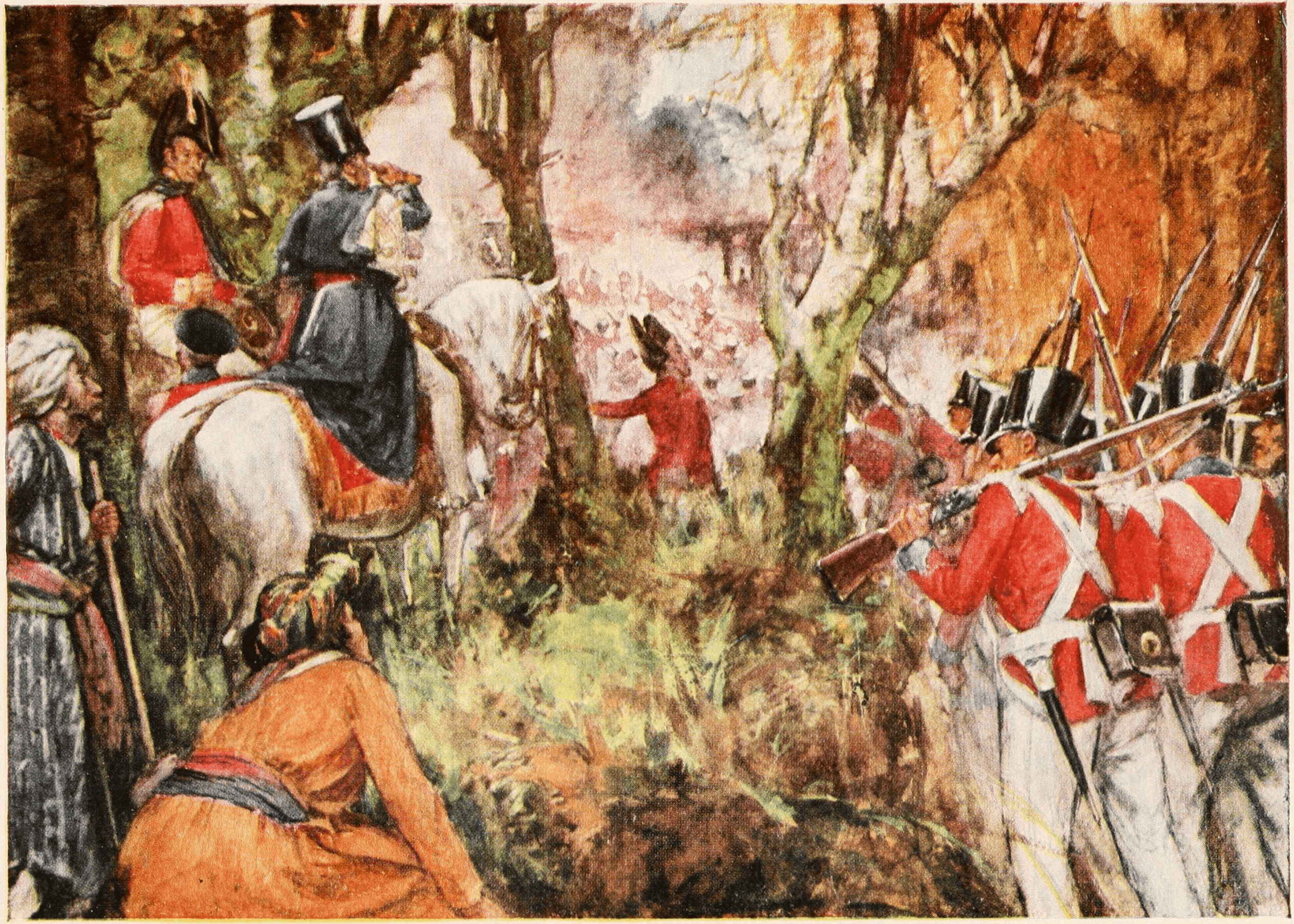
British Army passing through forests

=== Western theatre ===
The commander in chief of the Burmese army, Maha Bandula, was supported by 12 of the country's best divisions, including one under his personal command, all totaling 10,000 men and 500 horses. His general staff included some of the country's most decorated soldiers, men such as the Lord of Salay and the governors of Danyawaddy, Wuntho, and Taungoo. Bandula's plan was to attack the British on two fronts: Chittagong from Arakan in the southeast, and Sylhet from Cachar and Jaintia in the north. Bandula personally commanded the Arakan theatre while Uzana commanded the Cachar and Jaintia theater.

Early in the war, battle-hardened Burmese forces were able to push back the British forces because the Burmese, who had been fighting in the jungles of Manipur and Assam for nearly a decade, were more familiar with the terrain, which represented "a formidable obstacle to the march of a European force". The heavily wooded and hilly terrain prevented British troops from utilising their superior firepower as they do in pitched battles and were forced to engage Burmese forces either in terrain they could not past or against fortified stockades that were garrisoned with waiting Burmese troops. Uzana had already defeated the British units in Cachar and Jaintia in January 1824. The British sent reinforcements but they were largely indecisive. Most of the fighting on these fronts bogged down to small unit actions throughout the war until both withdrew.

In May, a Burmese column of some 4,000 men led by Maha Thiha Thura, the future Myawaddy Mingyi U Sa, fought their way into Bengal, defeating British troops at the Battle of Ramu, 10 miles (16 km) east of Cox's Bazar, on 17 May 1824. Thiha Thura's column then joined Bandula's column on the march to defeat British forces at Gadawpalin, and went on to capture Cox's Bazar. The Burmese success caused extreme panic in Chittagong and in Calcutta. Across the eastern Bengal, the European inhabitants formed themselves into militia forces. A large portion of the crews of the East India Company's ships was landed to assist in the defense of Calcutta.

But Bandula, not wanting to overstretch, stopped U Sa from proceeding to Chittagong. Had Bandula marched on to Chittagong, which unbeknown to him was lightly held, he could have taken it and the way to Calcutta would have opened. Had they been able to threaten Calcutta, the Burmese could have obtained more favourable terms in the subsequent peace negotiations.

=== Inside Burma ===
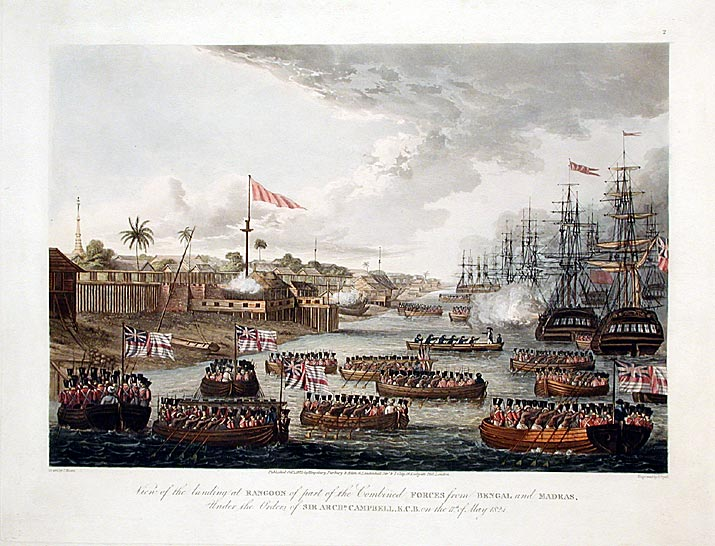
British naval force entered the harbour of Yangon (Rangoon) in May 1824

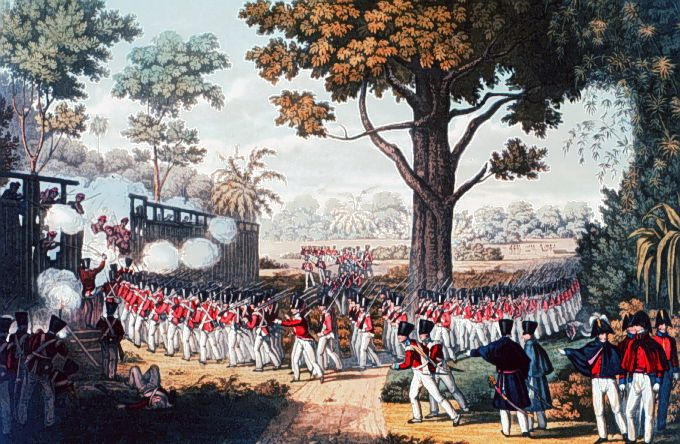
The Storming of the Lesser Stockade at Kemmendine near Yangon (Rangoon) on 10 June 1824

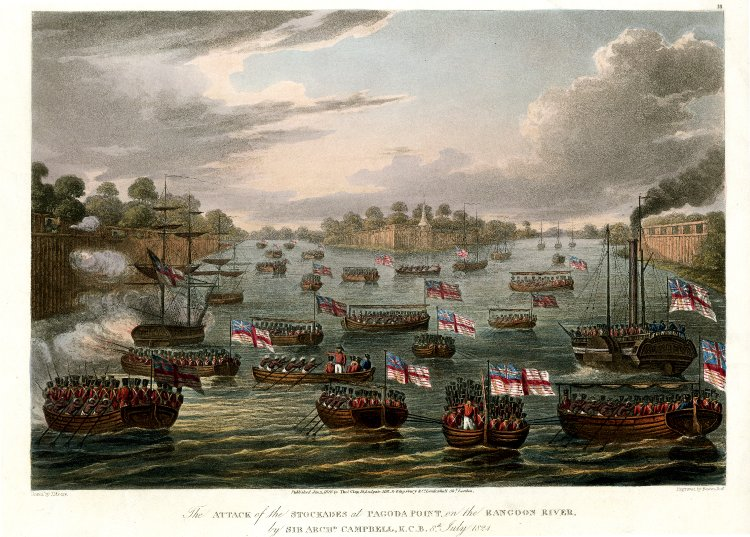
The Attack of the Stockades at Pagoda Point, on the Rangoon River, 8 July 1824

==== Battle of Yangon (May–December 1824) ====
Instead of fighting in hard terrain, the British took the fight to the Burmese mainland. On 11 May 1824, a British naval force of over 10,000 men (5,000 British soldiers and over 5,000 Indian sepoys) in 62 ships entered the harbour of Yangon (Rangoon), taking the Burmese by surprise. The Burmese, pursuing a scorched earth policy, left an empty city behind and chose to fortify positions along an east–west 10-mile (16 km) arc outside the city. This boxed the British from gathering supplies and foraging. The trapped expedition led by General Archibald Campbell took positions inside the Shwedagon Pagoda compound, which was fortified. The British launched attacks on Burmese lines and, by July 1824, had successfully pushed the Burmese towards Kamayut, five miles (8 km) from Shwedagon. Local Burmese efforts to retake Shwedagon in September failed.

King Bagyidaw ordered a near-complete withdrawal from the western front—Bandula from Arakan and Bengal, and Uzana from Assam, Cachar, and Jaintia to meet the British in Yangon. In August, in the midst of monsoon season, Bandula and his army crossed the Arakan Yoma. Moving tens of thousands of men over the 3,000-foot-high Arakan hills, or 10,000-foot-high Assamese ranges, heavily forested with only narrow footpaths and open to attack by tigers and leopards, would have been difficult even in mild weather conditions. The King later granted both Bandula and Uzana the title Agga Maha Thenapati (Sanskrit: Aggramahāsenāpati) equivalent to Field Marshal, the highest possible military rank. Bandula was also made the governor of Sittaung.

By November, Bandula commanded a large army outside Yangon. There is great discrepancy of the numbers ranging from 30,000 to 60,000 (mostly from British sources). Terrance Blackburn discuss the numbers and felt that Campbell had exaggerated the Burmese numbers in his reports to imply that the British only needed a few to vanquish a vast horde sent against them. According to the Burmese royal chronicles, the number was around 16,000. Regardless, the size of the Burmese host and the quickness in which Bandula had arrived impressed the British, whose rank and file called him "Sable Bonaparte".

Bandula believed that he could take on a well-armed British force of 10,000 head-on. Although the Burmese were numerically superior, only around half the army were musketeers, with the rest armed with spears and swords. The Burmese cannons fired only balls whereas the British cannons fired exploding shells. Unbeknown to him, the British had just received the first shipment of Congreve rockets, a new weapon in the war that the Burmese had never seen. More ominously for the Burmese, the speedy march through the hilly regions of Rakhine Yoma and Assamese ranges had left their troops exhausted.

On 30 November, in what turned out be the biggest mistake of his career, Bandula ordered a frontal attack on British positions. They attacked in a force of three columns each around 3,000 strong but they were all quickly separated as the British, with superior weaponry, withstood several Burmese charges at the Shwedagon forts, cutting down men by the thousands and defeating each column in detail. The heaviest losses the Burmese likely suffered was at Kemmendine where the British repurposed the formidable Burmese defenses they once struggled with and refitted with their own firepower. By 7th December, the British troops, supported by rocket fire, had begun to gain the upper hand, attacking the separated columns with naval artillery support. On 15 December, the Burmese were driven out of their last remaining stronghold at Kokine.

In the end, only 7,000 of the 16,000 Burmese soldiers returned to the royal army. The rest of the Burmese army, most of them conscripts fled and returned to their homes. Campbell's dispatches stated the Burmese suffered some 6,000 casualties over the 15 day battle. While this may be an exaggeration, Burmese chronicles conceded that their own losses were heavy. The British losses were considered heavy in proportion as well: 40 officers and 500 other ranks were killed or wounded in combat with a much larger number ill from disease considering that less than 3,000 men were engaged.

==== Battle of Danubyu (March–April 1825) ====
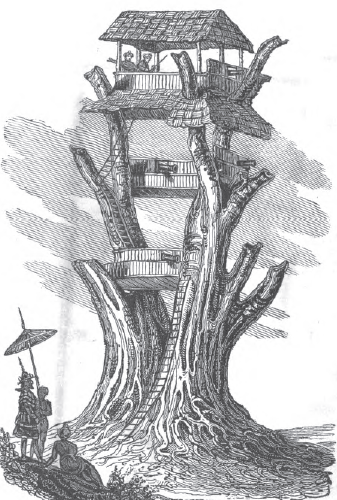
Bandula's lookout tree at Danybyu, mounted with four guns

Bandula fell back to his rear base at Danubyu, a small town not far from Yangon, in the Irrawaddy delta. Having lost experienced men in Yangon, the Burmese forces now numbered about 10,000, of mixed quality, including some of the king's best soldiers but also many untrained and barely armed conscripts. The stockade itself stretched one mile (1.6 km) along the riverbank, and was made up of solid teak beams no less than 15 feet (4.6 m) high.

In March 1825, a four thousand strong British force supported by a flotilla of gunboats attacked Danubyu. The first British attack failed, and Bandula attempted a counter-charge, with foot soldiers, cavalry and 17 fighting elephants. But the elephants were stopped by rocket fire and the cavalry found it impossible to move against the sustained British artillery fire.

On 1 April, the British launched a major attack, pounding down on the town with their heavy guns and raining their rockets on every part of the Burmese line. Bandula was killed by a mortar shell. Bandula had walked around the fort to boost the morale of his men, in his full insignia under a glittering golden umbrella, disregarding the warnings of his generals that he would prove an easy target for the enemy's guns. After Bandula's death, the Burmese evacuated Danubyu.

==== Arakan campaign (February–April 1825) ====
U Sa was left to command the remaining Burmese troops in Arakan after Bandula's death and the main battalions were ordered to withdraw from Arakan by Bagyidaw to meet the British invasion in Yangon in August 1824. Sa held on to Arakan throughout 1824 while fighting was concentrated in Yangon.

After Gen. Archibald Campbell finally defeated Gen. Bandula in the Battle of Yangon in December 1824, the British turned their sights on Arakan. On 1 February 1825, an invasion force of 11,000 soldiers supported by gunboats and armed cruisers along the coast, as well as a squadron of cavalry under the command of Gen. Morrison, attacked Burmese positions in Arakan. Despite their superior numbers and firearms, the British had to fight depleted Burmese forces for nearly two months before they reached the main Burmese garrison at Mrauk-U, Arakan's capital.

On 29 March 1825, the British launched their attack on Mrauk-U. (At the same time, Campbell also launched an attack on Bandula's positions in the Battle of Danubyu.) After a few days of fighting, the Burmese forces at Mrauk-U were defeated on 1 April, coincidentally the same day Maha Bandula fell at Danubyu. Sa and the remaining Burmese forces evacuated and left Arakan. The British proceeded to occupy the rest of Arakan.

==== Armistice ====
On 17 September 1825, an armistice was concluded for one month. In the course of the summer, General Joseph Wanton Morrison had conquered the province of Arakan; in the north, the Burmese were expelled from Assam; and the British had made some progress in Cachar, though their advance was finally impeded by the thick forests and jungle.

Peace negotiations that began in September broke down by early October after the Burmese would not agree to British terms. The British had demanded no less than the complete dismemberment of the Burmese western territories in Arakan, Assam, Manipur, and the Tenasserim coast as well as two million pounds sterling of indemnity. The Burmese would not agree to give up Arakan and the large sum of indemnity.

==== Battle of Prome (November–December 1825) ====
In November 1825, the Burmese decided to throw everything they had into a last-ditch effort. Starting in mid-November, the Burmese forces, consisting mainly of Shan regiments led by their sawbwas, threatened Prome in a daring circular movement that almost surrounded the town and cut off communications lines to Yangon. In the end, the superior firepower of the British guns and missiles won out. On 1 December, Gen. Campbell, with 2500 European and 1500 Indian sepoys, supported by a flotilla of gunboats, attacked the main Burmese position outside Prome. On 2 December, Maha Ne Myo was killed by a shell launched from the flotilla. After Maha Ne Myo's death, the British dislodged the Burmese by 5 December.

The defeat in Prome effectively left the Burmese army in disarray, and it was in constant retreat from then on. On 26 December, they sent a flag of truce to the British camp. Negotiations having commenced, the Burmese capitulated to the British terms to end the war, signing the Treaty of Yandabo in February 1826.

== Treaty of Yandabo ==
The British demanded and the Burmese agreed to:

1. Cede to the British Assam, Manipur, Rakhine (Arakan), and Taninthayi (Tenasserim) coast south of the Salween River
2. Cease all interference in Cachar and Jaintia
3. Pay an indemnity of one million pounds sterling in four installments
4. Allow for an exchange of diplomatic representatives between Ava and Calcutta
5. Sign a commercial treaty in due course
6. The first installment of indemnity was to be paid immediately, the second installment within the first 100 days from signing of the treaty, and the rest within two years. Until the second installment was paid, the British would not leave Yangon.

The Treaty of Yandabo was signed by General Campbell from the British side and Governor of Legaing Maha Min Hla Kyaw Htin from the Burmese side on 24 February 1826. The Burmese paid 250,000 pounds sterling in gold and silver bullion as the first installment of the indemnity, and also released British prisoners of war. The war was thus brought to an end, and the British army moved south. The British army remained in the territories surrendered to it under the treaty and in the territories such as the Rangoon area which were occupied for several years to guarantee compliance with the financial terms of the treaty.

== Aftermath ==
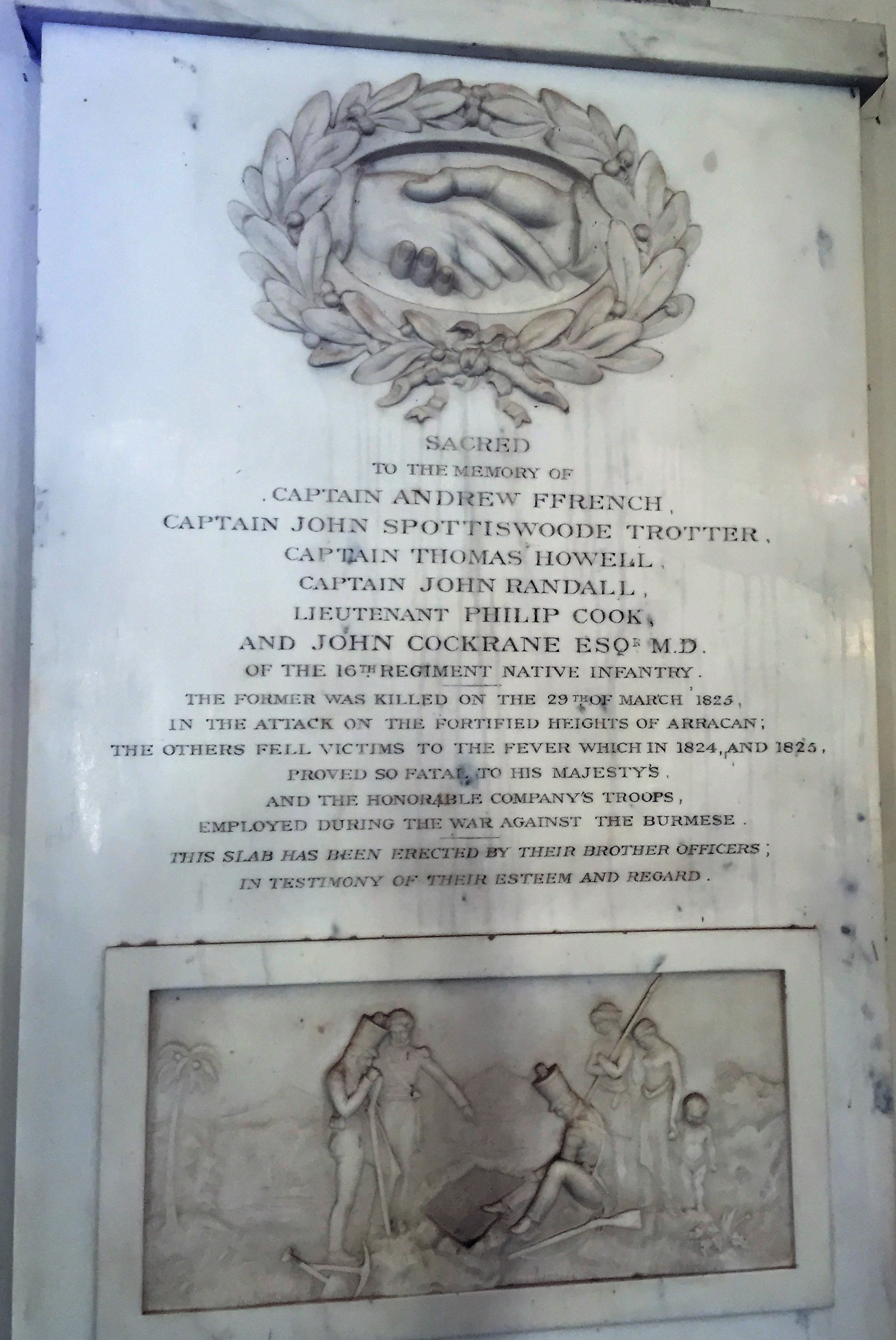
First Burma War Memorial at the St. George's Cathedral, Chennai

While both nations suffered heavy military and financial losses, the treaty imposed a more severe financial burden on the Burmese Kingdom and effectively left it crippled.

The British terms in the negotiations were strongly influenced by the heavy cost in lives and money which the war had entailed. Some 40,000 British and Indians troops had been involved, of whom 15,000 died. British casualties were blamed on poor planning and logistics as only a quarter of the casualties were from the fighting while almost 70% were from tropical diseases. In the Arakan Campaign alone, 659 Europeans out of 1,500 and some 3,500 Indians out of a total of 8,000 died in hospital. The 1st Madras European Regiment lost 600 out of 900 men in two years. Despite the official reports' emphasis on the disparity of death from disease and combat casualties, Captain Frederick Doveton commented on the British casualties that they were nevertheless high for the troops that engaged, "in the case before us the proportion of killed and wounded to the numbers engaged and space of time occupied may bear in comparison to the palmy and bloody days of Talavera and Waterloo!" According to Campbell's casualty list in Burma, the expedition suffered some 5,000 combat casualties.

The cost to British India's finances had been almost ruinous, amounting to approximately 13 million pounds sterling. The cost of war contributed to a severe economic crisis in India, which by 1833 had bankrupted the Bengal agency houses and cost the British East India Company its remaining privileges, including the monopoly of trade to China. The early defeats, the lackluster performance of the troops and poor treatment of Indian Sepoys weakened British authority in India particularly in regions that had only been occupied by the British. This led to a number of uprisings notably by Bharatpur. According to Sashi Bhusan Chaudhuri, "But the reported decline of the power of the government in the First Burmese war and the failure of the autumnal harvest in 1824, acted as an incentive to acts of violence and rebellion among the turbulent tribes of Hariana, Bhatnair, and Bikaner. The insurgents, the Jats, Mewatis, and Bhattis plundered government effects 'proclaiming that its authority was at an end’." Spencer Walpole described the situation “the slow and doubtful success which had attended the British arms created unsusual excitement throughout India. The natives imagined that the tide of conquest had at length reached its height, and that it was at last beginning to recede.” Furthermore, in the newly gained Arakan and Tenasserim, as it became clear that the British had no intention of returning the local leaders to power, a number of Mon and Rakhine leaders revolted.

For the Burmese, the treaty was a total humiliation and a long-lasting financial burden. A whole generation of men had been wiped out in battle. The world the Burmese knew, of conquest and martial pride, built on the back of the impressive military success of the previous seventy-five years, had come crashing down. The Court of Ava could not come to terms with the loss of the territories and made unsuccessful attempts to get them back. An uninvited British resident in Ava was a daily reminder of the humiliating defeat. Amherst's successor Governor-General William Cavendish-Bentinck later regretted the Treaty of Yandabo considering it far too harsh that damaged the future of Anglo-Burmese relations stating that, "that at the close of the Burmese war, we had not adopted the same measures as those that we did at the close of the Nepal war, for graduaIly removing from the minds of our opponents the sore and angry feelings left there by defeat, assuring them of the sincerity of our desire of cultivating friendly relations and keeping our government weIl informed of the real view and state of parties at the capital of Ava." The defeated and exhausted Royal Burmese Army also had to deal with a major Mon uprising in territories previously occupied by the British.

In addition, the burden of indemnity left the Burmese royal treasury bankrupt for years. The indemnity of one million pounds sterling was considered a large sum in Europe at that time. It appeared even more daunting when converted to the Burmese kyat equivalent of 10 million. The cost of living of the average villager in Upper Burma in 1826 was one kyat per month.

While both the Burmese and British authorities would quickly put down the uprisings, it kindled the hostilty between the two and the British would wage two less expensive wars against the weaker Burmese in 1852 and 1885, and annex entire Burma by 1885.

== British order of battle ==
Under the command of General Cotton:

- British Regiments of Foot: 1st, 41st (270 men), and 89th (260 men) regiments
- Madras Native Infantry: 18th and 28th regiments
- 250 Royal Engineers
- 100 Pioneers
- Some artillery

Under the command of General Campbell:

- British Regiments of Foot: 13th, 38th, 47th, and 87th regiments
- 2nd Battalion, The Madras European Regiment
- Madras Native Infantry: 3rd, 7th, 9th, 12th, 18th, 25th, 26th, 30th, 34th, 43rd, Regiments
- 1st Battalion Madras Pioneers
- Detachment Bengal European Foot Artillery
- Bengal Native Infantry: 13th (Light Infantry), 38th, 40th Regiments

Defence at Prome:

- Four Madras Native Infantry regiments

== In fiction ==
- On the Irrawaddy by G. A. Henty is a fictional account of the First Anglo-Burmese War.
- Marching to Ava, A Story of the First Burmese War by Henry Charles Moore [1904] is a fictional account of the campaign featuring fictional character Guy Clifford along with Sir Archibald Campbell as the Commanding Officer
- The first few chapters of the novel The Sabre's Edge by Allan Mallinson are set during the First Anglo-Burmese War.

== See also ==
- Burmese invasions of Assam
- Barrackpore Mutiny of 1824
- Burma–France relations
- History of Burma
- Konbaung dynasty
- Sino–Burmese War (1765–1769)
- Second Anglo-Burmese War
- Third Anglo-Burmese War
