= Danubyu =

Town in Ayeyarwady Region, Myanmar

Coordinates: 17°15′N 95°35′E

Danubyu (Burmese: ဓနုဖြူမြို့ [dənṵbjù mjo̰]) is a town in the Ayeyarwady Division of south-west Myanmar, located on the west bank of the Ayeyarwady River in the Ayeyarwady Delta. It is the seat of the Danubyu Township in the Maubin District.

== History ==
After the loss to the British in the Battle of Yangon during the First Anglo-Burmese War, Maha Bandula retreated to Danubyu. He quickly built a fort using local trees and built up a strong stockade with 10,000 troops. When the British arrived in early 1825, they started a siege but was unable to break through Bandula's defences after a few months despite their superior weaponry. During the Battle of Danubyu, Bandula defended against the first attack but lost after a failed counter-charge with elephants. Bandula was killed in Danubyu by a mortar shell while walking around in the open against the warning of his generals in an attempt to boost morale.

== Economy ==
As the area around Danubyu is fertile and nutrient-rich, agriculture is the town's main industry. Major crops include rice and Matpe beans. Danubyu also has produces tobacco as well as traditional carpet-weaving.

In 2023, the town had 23,012 people.
