= Maha Bandula =

Burmese general

- မဟာဗန္ဓုလ
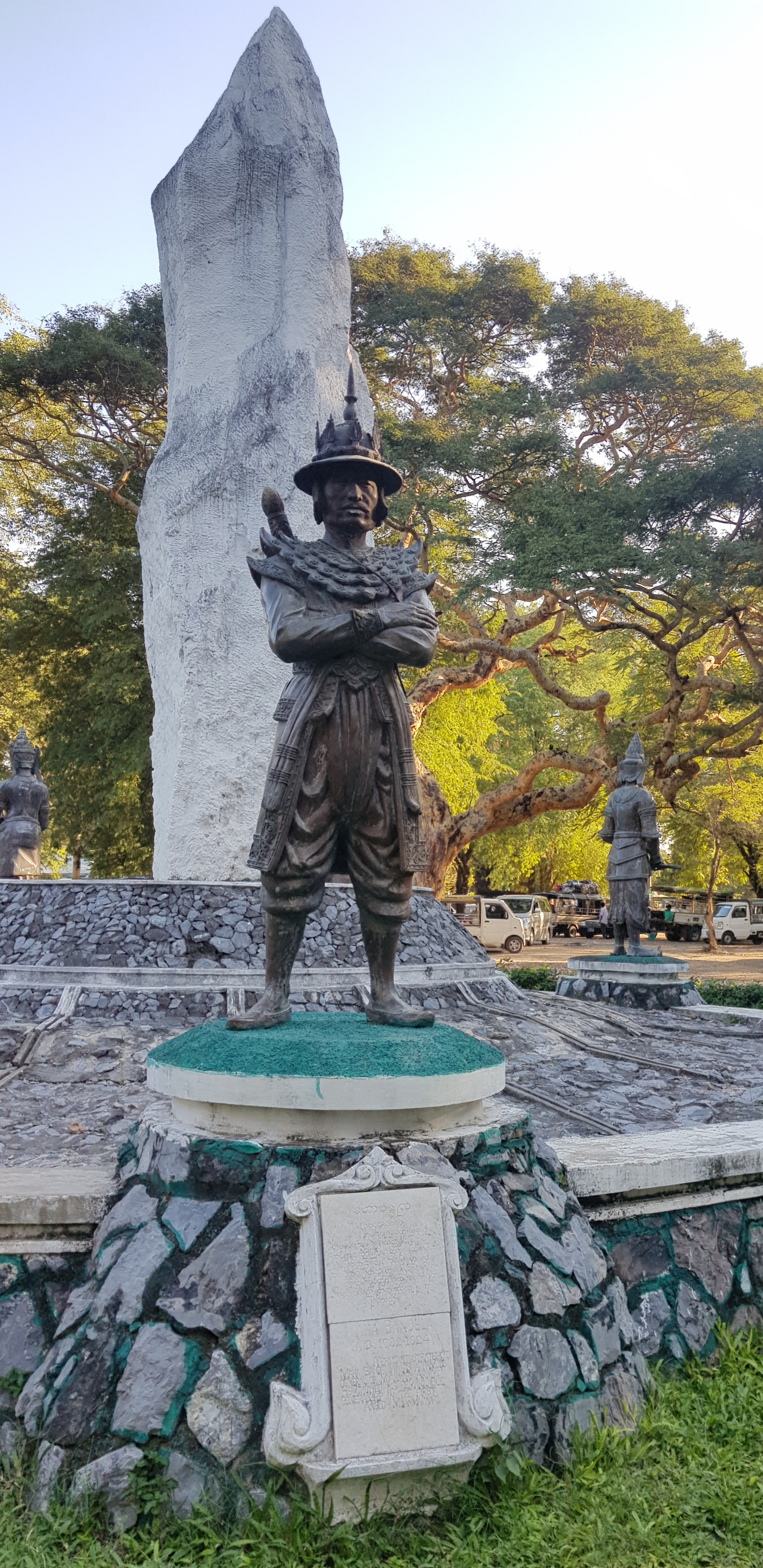
- statue in Mandalay Palace
- Born: 6 November 1782; Dabayin, Kingdom of Burma
- Died: 1 April 1825 (aged 42); Danubyu, Kingdom of Burma
- Military career
- Allegiance: Konbaung Dynasty
- Branch: Royal Burmese Armed Forces
- Service years: 1806–1825
- Rank: Commander-in-chief (1821–1825); General Sitke (1819–1821); Regiment commander Bo-Hmu (1814–1819)
- Conflicts: Burmese–Manipuri War (1814); Burmese–Assam War (1816–1817); Burmese–Assam War (1818–1819); Burmese–Manipuri War (1819); Burmese–Assam War (1821–1822); First Anglo-Burmese War
- Awards: Agga Maha Thenapati (1823–1825); Thado Maha Bandula (1819–1823); Ne Myo Thura Yegaung (1813–1819)

General Maha Bandula (Burmese: မဟာဗန္ဓုလ [məhà bàɰ̃dṵla̰]; 6 November 1782 – 1 April 1825) was commander-in-chief of the Royal Burmese Armed Forces from 1821 until his death in 1825 in the First Anglo-Burmese War. Nicknamed by his British opponents as the "Sable Bonaparte" and the "Wellington", Bandula was a key figure in the Konbaung dynasty's policy of expansionism in Manipur and Assam that ultimately resulted in the war and the beginning of the downfall of the dynasty and the end of Burmese independence. Nonetheless, the general, who died in action, is celebrated as a national hero by the Burmese for his resistance to the British. Today, some of the most prominent places in the country are named after him.

== Early life ==
Maha Bandula was born Maung Yit (မောင်ရစ် [màʊɰ̃ jɪʔ]) on 6 November 1782 (Wednesday, 2nd waxing of Tazaungmon 1144 ME) in Dabayin, the firstborn son of a minor gentry family of Pauk Taw (ပေါက်တော) and his wife, Nyein (ငြိမ်, as in "calm"; not the more common ငြိမ်း as in "finality/completed"). He had three siblings: brother Aye (အေး), sister Dok (ဒုတ်), and brother Myat Ne (မြတ်နေ). As customary with Burmese boys of the era, Yit from age of 6 received education at the local Buddhist monastery. He had to quit his studies before he turned 13 after his father died of illness. He had to take on early responsibilities in his youth after the death of his father. He worked the sesame fields with his mother and looked after his younger siblings. He got married a few years later to Shin Min Bu (ရှင်မင်းဘူး). They had a son named Kyan Gyi (ကျန်းကြီး).

== Service ==
Later in his youth, Yit moved to Amarapura, then the kingdom's capital, to serve as the lowest grade retainer in the royal service of Crown Prince Thado Minsaw, who had his hometown Dababyin in fief. Stockily built and loud—based on his body armor, his height is estimated to be about 173 cm or 5′ 8″—Yit proved a quick study in martial arts, horseback riding and war elephant riding, and quickly rose through the ranks, becoming one of the crown prince's personal bodyguards in 1806. It was here as a royal bodyguard that Yit became exposed to military arts, receiving a further education in military strategy and tactics.

However Yit's rising career ran into a stall when Thado Minsaw died in April 1808. While he continued to be part of the Palace Guards, Yit was no longer in the inner circle of the new crown prince, the Prince of Sagaing. Yit dutifully served for the next four years in the background but still was not noticed. Deeply frustrated, Yit made a bold move to be noticed one day in late 1812, (soon after the second son of the crown prince was born on 27 October 1812): he punched a fellow palace guardsman Nanda Bala for no apparent reason. Duly arrested and brought before the crown prince, Yit explained that he just wanted to be called "Nga Yit" by the crown prince just once, and that he would gladly go to prison for his behavior. Impressed by Yit's bold behavior, the crown prince pardoned Yit and made him a messenger in his Privy Council (ဗြဲတိုက် သံဆင့်). Yit did not disappoint. In about six months, in June 1813 (Nayon 1175 ME), he was appointed governor of his hometown Dabayin with the title of Ne Myo Thura Yegaung (နေမျိုး သူရ ရဲခေါင်).

In the next decade, Yit would participate in the expansionist wars of King Bodawpaya and his successor King Bagyidaw.

=== Manipur (1814) ===
Yit's first battlefield experience came in Manipur. On 15 February 1814 (11th waning of Tabodwe 1175 ME), a 20,000-strong Burmese army left their forward bases along the Chindwin to invade Manipur in order to place their nominee on the Manipuri throne. Yit served under the command of co-commander-in-chief, Ne Myo Yazathu, and commanded three regiments (3000 men). The Burmese forces easily overran Manipuri defenses; Yit's regiments participated in the capture of the Manipuri capital. Yit was noticed for his leadership skills.

=== Assam (1816–1819) ===
Bodawpaya's next target was Assam, another kingdom to the west but a larger one than Manipur. In 1816, the Assamese governor of Guwahati, Badan Chandra Borphukan sought help from the Burmese king in order to oust his political rival Purnananda Burhagohain, the Prime Minister. Bodawpaya agreed, and in December 1816, sent a 16,000-strong force led by Gen. Maha Minhla Minkhaung to Assam. Yit was a junior commander. The Burmese forces entered Assam in January 1817 and defeated the Assamese army at the battle of Ghiladhari. A fresh Assamese force was raised to defend the capital. The new Assamese army made a stand at Kathalbari near the Assamese capital Jorhat but was promptly defeated. King Chandrakanta Singha now agreed to become a tributary of Burma, and gave many presents and Ahom princess Hemo Aideo in marriage to the Burmese king. A year later, the pro-Burmese prime minister Badan Chandra Borphukan was assassinated, and the Ahom king Chandrakanta Singha was deposed by a rival political faction led by Ruchinath Burhagohain. Chandrakanta Singha sought help from Bodawpaya. Yit was again called on to serve in November 1818 and in February 1819, the Burmese forces invaded Assam and reinstalled Chandrakanta Singha on the throne of Assam. In both Assamese campaigns, Yit was a regimental commander, two ranks below the overall commander-in-chief. Though a junior commander, Yit proved his worth on the battlefield, and his input was valued by the senior commanders. After a successful campaign in Assam, he was promoted to governor of Ahlon-Monywa in June 1819 (Nayon 1181 ME) by his lord the Prince of Sagaing who had just ascended to the Burmese throne as King Bagyidaw. On 3 November 1819 (2nd waning of Tazaungmon 1181), Yit was given the title of Maha Bandula (Pali: 𑀫𑀳𑀸𑀩𑀦𑁆𑀥𑀼𑀮, Mahābandhula) by the king. It is a title by which he would be remembered.

=== Manipur (1819) ===
Maha Bandula's first major military action as a senior commander came soon after in Manipur. The small kingdom in the west was a rebellion-prone protectorate between 1758 and 1782, and had been retaken by Bodawpaya since 1814. When the raja of Manipur, Marjit Singh, who was placed on the throne by the Burmese only five years earlier, did not attend the new king's coronation ceremony or send an embassy bearing tribute, as all vassal kings had an obligation to do, Bagyidaw sent an expeditionary force to reclaim Manipur.

In December 1819, the Burmese forces invaded Manipur, under the overall command of Thado Minye Kyawhtin, the king's brother. Maha Bandula was one of two deputy commander-in-chiefs (Sitke). He commanded an infantry force of 5000 men and 500 cavalry, followed by Gen. Ne Myo Thura Minhla Nawrahta's 20,000 infantrymen and 2500 cavalry. The Manipuris made their stand near their capital. The fort, surrounded by high hills on two sides and heavily fortified by stout timber gates on the remaining side, was said to be nearly impregnable. Bandula sent in commandos who scaled the hills at night and broke open the stout gates, allowing the Burmese to take the fort and the capital. Raja Marjit Singh fled to the neighboring state of Cachar, which was ruled by his brother Chourjit Singh. The daring operation made him famous.

After the conquest, the Burmese left a garrison in Manipur, backed by a long supply line up the Chindwin river.

=== Assam (1821–1822) ===
The Ahom King of Assam, Chandrakanta Singha tried to free himself from Burmese influence. He collected mercenaries from Bengal and started to strengthen his army and constructed fortifications to prevent further invasion of Burmese. King Bagyidaw again turned to Bandula to reclaim Assam.

In February 1821, a Burmese army of 20,000 (including 10,000 Hkamti Shan and Kachin levies) crossed the snow-clad mountains to Assam from their northernmost forts along the Hukawng valley. After nearly a year and a half of hard-fought battles in some of the most difficult terrains in the world, the Burmese forces finally defeated Chandra Kanta Singha and the Assamese army in July 1822. Bagyidaw installed Jogeshwar Singha, a brother of Hemo Aideo, the Ahom princess who was married to Bodawpaya as the new Ahom king of Assam and a military governor-general was appointed to look after the administration. The defeated Assamese king Chandrakanta Singha fled to British territory of Bengal. The British ignored Bandula's demands to surrender the fugitive king, and instead sent reinforcement units to frontier forts. Maha Bandula left a military garrison of 2000 men commanded by Gen. Maha Thilawa, and returned to Ava.

=== First Anglo-Burmese War (1824–1826) ===
By 1822, the conquests of Manipur and Assam had brought a long border between British India and the kingdom of Ava. The British, based in Calcutta, had their own designs on the region, and actively supported rebellions in Manipur, Assam and Arakan. Calcutta unilaterally declared Cachar and Jaintia British protectorates, and sent in troops. Cross border raids into these newly acquired territories from British territories and spheres of influence vexed the Burmese. Convinced that war was inevitable, Bandula became a main proponent of offensive policy against the British. Bandula was part of the war party at Bagyidaw's court, which also included Queen Me Nu and her brother, the lord of Salin. Bandula believed that a decisive victory could allow Ava to consolidate its gains in its new western empire in Arakan, Manipur, Assam, Cachar and Jaintia, as well as take over eastern Bengal.

In January 1824, Bandula sent in one of his top lieutenants Thado Thiri Maha Uzana into Cachar and Jaintia to chase away the rebels. The British sent in their own force to meet the Burmese in Cachar, resulting in the first clashes between the two. The war formally broke out on 5 March 1824, following border clashes in Arakan.

==== Western theater ====
As the commander-in-chief of the Burmese army, Maha Bandula was supported by twelve of the country's best battalions, including one under his personal command, totaling ten thousand men and five hundred horses. His general staff included some of the country's most decorated soldiers, men like the lord of Salay and the governors of Danyawaddy, Wuntho and Taungoo. Bandula's plan was to attack the British on two fronts: Chittagong from Arakan in the southeast, and Sylhet from Cachar and Jaintia in the north. Bandula personally commanded the Arakan theater while Uzana commanded the Cachar and Jaintia theaters.

Early in the war, battle hardened Burmese forces were able to push back the British forces because the Burmese, who had been fighting in the jungles of Manipur and Assam for nearly a decade, were more familiar with the terrain which represented "a formidable obstacle to the march of a European force". Uzana had already defeated the British units in Cachar and Jaintia in January 1824. In May, Burmese forces led by Lord Myawaddy defeated units of British India Army in the Battle of Ramu, inside British territory, causing a great panic in Calcutta. But Bandula, not wanting to overstretch, stopped Myawaddy from proceeding to Chittagong. Had Bandula marched on to Chittagong, which unbeknown to him was lightly held, he could have taken it and the way to Calcutta would have been open.

==== Battle of Yangon (May–December 1824) ====
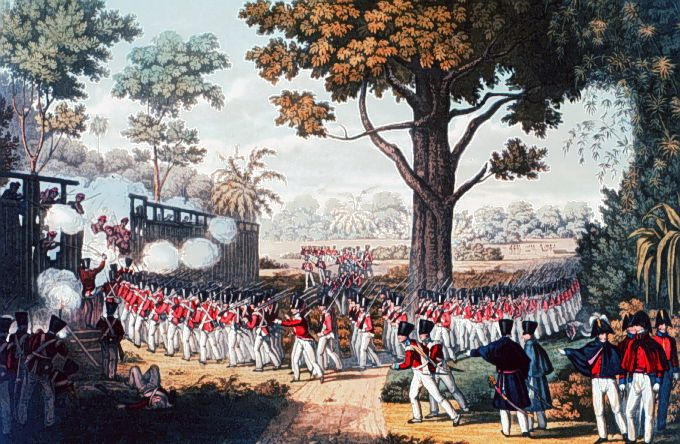
Battle in Kyimyindaing

Instead of fighting in hard terrain, the British took the fight to the Burmese mainland. On 11 May 1824, a British naval force of over 10,000 men (5000 British soldiers and over 5000 Indian sepoys) entered the harbor of Yangon, taking the Burmese by surprise. The Burmese pursuing a scotched earth policy, left an empty city, and instead chose to fortify positions along an east–west 10-mile arc outside the city. The British forces led by General Archibald Campbell took position inside a fortified Shwedagon Pagoda compound. The British launched attacks on Burmese lines, and by July 1824, had successfully pushed the Burmese towards Kamayut, five miles from Shwedagon. Burmese efforts to retake Shwedagon in September failed.

King Bagyidaw ordered a near complete withdrawal from the western front—Bandula from Arakan and Bengal, and Uzana from Assam, Cachar and Jaintia—and meet the enemy in Yangon. In August, in the midst of monsoon season, Bandula and his army crossed the Arakan Yoma. Even in good weather, moving tens of thousands of men over the 3,000 ft (910 m) high Arakan hills or 10,000 ft (3,000 m) high Assamese ranges, heavily forested and with only narrow footpaths, open to attack by tigers and leopards, would be difficult. To do this at the height of the drenching monsoon season was no easy task. Yet Bandula (from Arakan) and Uzana (from Assam) in a testament to their generalship and logistical skill, managed to do just that. The king granted both Bandula and Uzana the title Agga Maha Thenapati (Pali: Aggamahāsenāpati), the highest possible military rank. Bandula was also made the governor of Sittaung.

By November, Bandula commanded a force of 30,000 massed outside Yangon. Bandula believed that he could take on a well-armed British force of 10,000 head-on. Although the Burmese were numerically superior, only 15,000 of the 30,000 had muskets. The Burmese cannons fired only balls whereas the British cannons fired exploding shells. Unbeknown to him, the British had just received the first shipment of the newest weapon in war that the Burmese had never seen–Congreve rockets.

On 30 November, in what turned out be the biggest mistake of his career, Bandula ordered a frontal attack on British positions. The British with far superior weaponry, withstood several Burmese gallant charges at the Shwedagon fort, cutting down men by thousands. By 7 December, the British troops, supported by rocket fire, had begun to gain the upper hand. On 15 December, the Burmese were driven out of their last remaining stronghold at Kokine. In the end, only 7000 of the 30,000 Burmese soldiers returned.

==== Battle of Danubyu (March–April 1825) ====
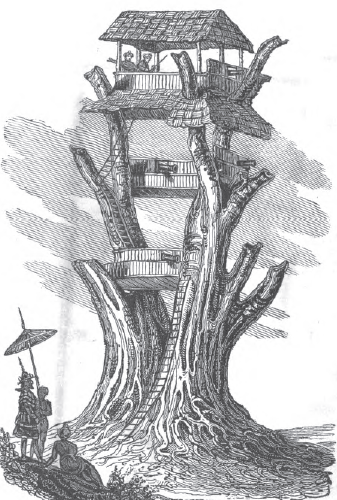
Maha Bandula inspects a lookout tree at Danubyu.

Bandula fell back to his rear base at Danubyu, a small town not far from Yangon, in the Irrawaddy delta. Having lost experienced men in Yangon, the Burmese forces now numbered about 10,000, of mixed quality, including some of the king's best soldiers but also many untrained and barely armed conscripts. The stockade itself stretched a mile along the riverbank, and was made up of solid teak beams no less than 15 feet high.

In March 1825, a four thousand strong British force supported by a flotilla of gun boats attacked Danubyu. The first British attack failed, and Bandula attempted a counter charge, with foot soldiers, cavalry and 17 fighting elephants. But the elephants were stopped by rocket fire and the cavalry found it impossible to move against the sustained British artillery fire.

On 1 April, the British launched a major attack, pounding down on the town with their heavy guns and raining their rockets on every part of the Burmese line. Bandula was killed by a mortar shell hitting him. Bandula had walked around the fort to boost the morale of his men, in his full insignia under a glittering golden umbrella, discarding the warnings of his generals that he would prove an easy target for the enemy's guns.

== Legacy ==
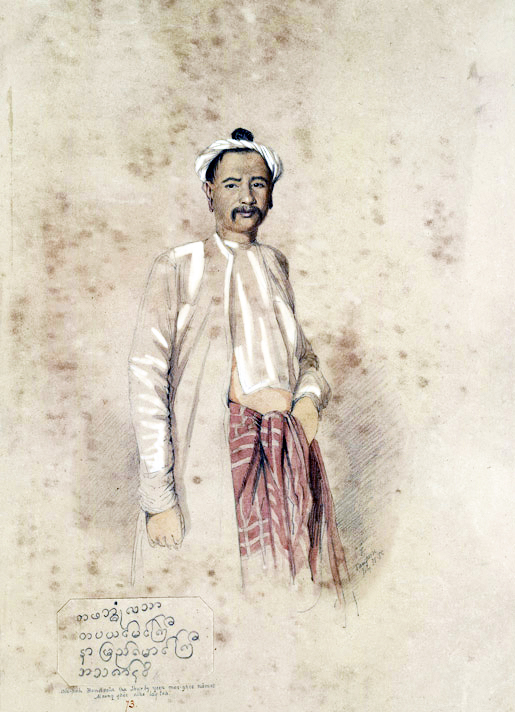
Maha Bandula's son, Maung Gyi, who served the Konbaung army, but later defected to the British.

Maha Bandula looms large in Burmese history for his courage to take on the British. Due in large measure to Bandula's leadership, the First Anglo-Burmese War was the only one of the three Anglo-Burmese wars in which the Burmese were able to put up a fight.

The Burmese remember Bandula's last words in this way:

We may lose the battle. This is our destiny. We fight our best and we pay our lives. However, I cannot suffer indignity and disgrace for losing the battle for the lack of courage and fighting prowess. Let them realize that the Burmese lost the battle because of the loss of their Supreme Commander. This will prove to be an everlasting example of the Burmese fighting spirit and enhance the honor and glory of our nation and the people amongst the neighboring states.

His use of direct confrontation and aggressive tactics, which had contributed to earlier victories in Manipur and Assam, did not succeed against the British forces, who had defeated Napoleon's armies a decade earlier and had superior weaponry. Bandula did not change tactics in response to British weaponry. Sources have suggested that guerrilla-style tactics might not have changed the outcome of the war, but could have resulted in less severe terms.

=== Popularity and fame ===
Bandula remains extremely popular in Burmese imagination, and is often the only general ranked alongside famous Burmese kings. His popularity is perhaps not just due to his skills as a military commander. After all, Bandula's victories came with able, experienced lieutenants like Gen. Ne Myo Thura Min Hla Nawrahta in Manipur, Gen. Myawaddy Mingyi U Sa in Arakan and Gen. Maha Thilawa in Assam. Besides, the country has known more successful generals like Gen. Maha Thiha Thura who defeated the Qing dynasty's invasions in 1766, 1767 and 1769, Gen. Maha Nawrahta and Gen. Ne Myo Thihapate, who dismembered Siam in 1767, or King Bayinnaung, the soldier king, who captured much of western mainland South East Asia in the 16th century. Then again, they never fought against the British, the world superpower of the day.

Rather, Bandula's continued popularity is because of his courage to fight on against an overwhelmingly superior enemy. Perhaps, it is also because the Burmese view Bandula as the proxy for the last glory days of the Third Burmese Empire. The Burmese remember that Bandula's death was followed by a series of one ignominious setback after another that eventually led to the loss of sovereignty in 1885. It is also possible that he is well remembered as there are a number of British accounts who mentioned Bandula admiringly despite his failures. In particular, the British have praised Danubyu's defenses and had expected a long taxing siege. Indeed, some would say the ignominious setbacks continue up to this day. For whatever reason, Maha Bandula remains the most famous general in Burmese history.

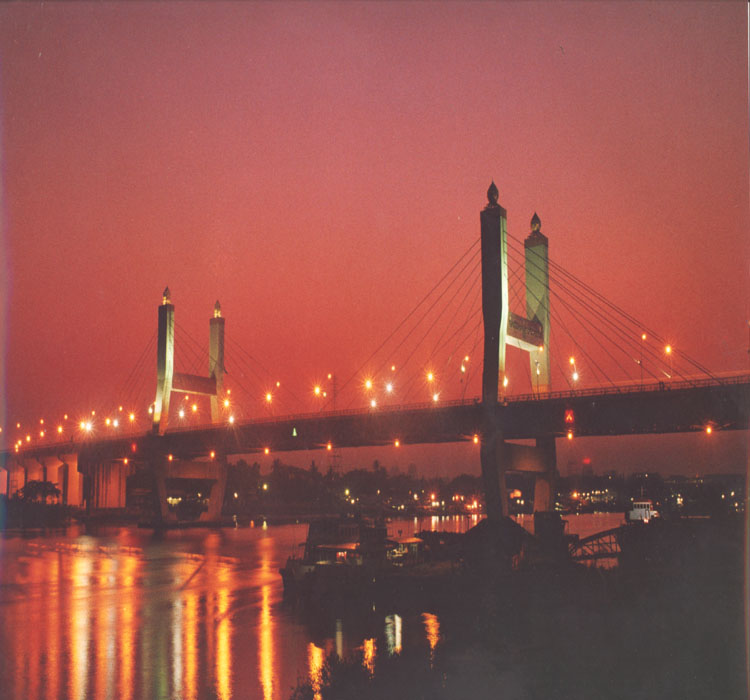
Maha Bandula Bridge in Downtown Yangon

=== Commemorations ===
Team Bandula is one of five student teams into which all students in every Burmese primary and secondary school are organized. The other four teams are named after the greatest kings of Burmese history: Team Anawrahta, Team Kyansittha, Team Bayinnaung and Team Alaungpaya.

Some of the most prominent places in Myanmar are named after the fallen general.

- Maha Bandula Road, one of four major avenues in downtown Yangon
- Maha Bandula Park in the center of downtown Yangon
- Maha Bandula Park Road, a busy street in downtown Yangon
- Maha Bandula Bridge, a bridge in eastern Yangon
- UMS Maha Bandula, Myanmar Navy Frigate

=== Military ===
- Bandula Badge
  In honour of Maha Bandula, modern day Burma Army's infantry badge included the မောက်တို helmet that he wore during his service. The badge is also known as Bandula Badge.

== See also ==
- First Anglo-Burmese War
