= List of children of Mindon Min =

The following is a list of children of King Mindon Min. In total, Mindon Min had 45 consorts and concubines, who bore him 55 sons and 53 daughters, for a total of 108 children. Among his consorts included 4 queens of first rank (နန်းရ မိဖုရား) and 4 queens of second rank (အဆောင်ရ မိဖုရား).

Consort	Remarks	Children
Thiri Pawara Atula Tilawka Maha Yazeindadipati Yadana Dewi, Nanmadaw Mibaya	Chief Queen (တောင်နန်းမိဖုရား)	-
Thiri Maha Yadana Mingala Dewi, Myauknandaw Mibaya	Queen of the Northern Palace (မြောက်နန်းမိဖုရား)	-
Thiri Pawara Tilawka Maha Yazeindadipati Paduma Yadana Dewi, Alenandaw Mibaya	Queen of the Central Palace (အလယ်နန်း မိဖုရား)	Thiri Thu Yadana Mingala Dewi, Princess of Mong Naung; Princess Shwekodawgyi; Prince of Yan Aung Myin; Thiri Thu Paba Yadana Dewi, Princess of Myadaung; Prince of Bantgyi (aka Panche); Thiri Thu Theinga Yadana Dewi, Princess of Yamethin
Thiri Maha Thu Sanda Dewi, First Anauknandaw Mibaya	First Queen of the Western Palace (ပထမ အနောက်နန်း မိဖုရား)	Unnamed son; Unnamed daughter
Thiri Maha Thu Sanda Yadana Dewi, Second Anauknandaw Mibaya	Second Queen of the Western Palace (ဒုတိယ အနောက်နန်း မိဖုရား)	-
Thiri Maha Thu Mingala Sanda Dewi, Magway Mibaya	Nanzwe Mibaya	Prince of Le Gaing; Thiri Thu Yadana Dewi, Princess of Mingin; Thu Pabawadi, Princess of Pyinzi
Thiri Maha Thu Pabadewi, Laungshe Mibaya	Nanzwe Mibaya	Thu Thiri Pabawadi, Princess of Chundaung; Thu Thiri Yadana Dewi, Princess of Maingkaing; Thu Thiri Maha Dhamma Yaza, Prince of Thibaw; Thiri Thu Rusawadi, Princess of Meiktila and Pyaungbya
Thiri Thu Paba Yadana Dewi, Seindon Mibaya	Nanzwe Mibaya	-
Atula Dewi, Taungsaungdaw Mibaya	Queen of the Southern Apartment	Unnamed daughter; Unnamed son; Unnamed son; Thado Min Nyunt, Prince of Sagu; Thado Minhla Theinkhathu, Prince of Mohnyin; Thiri Kinsana Wadi, Princess of Kyauksauk and later of Mohnyin
Pabadewi, First Myauksaungdaw Mibaya	First Queen of the Northern Apartment	Thu Thiri Maha Dhamma Yaza, Prince of Malun; Unnamed daughter; Thado Minye, Prince of Pyinzi; Thado Minye Thihathu, Prince of Wuntho
Nanda Dewi, Second Myauksaungdaw Mibaya	Second Queen of the Northern Apartment	Thiri Thu Sanda Dewi, Princess of Kanni; Thiri Thu Manla Wadi, Princess of Mabe; Thiri Maha Thu Dhamma Yaza, Prince of Mekkhaya; Thiri Thama Dewi, Princess of Kyannyat; Thiri Thu Mingala Dewi, Princess of Sinshyin; Unnamed son
Yadana Dewi, First Taungshweye Mibaya	First Queen of the Southern Gilded Chamber	Thu Maha Thiri Dhamma Yaza, Prince of Myingun; Unnamed daughter; Unnamed daughter; Thada Minhla Zeyathu, Prince of Myinkhondaing
Thu Dhamma Dewi, Second Taungshweye Mibaya	Second Queen of the Southern Gilded Chamber	Unnamed son; Unnamed daughter; Thiri Thu Mingala Dewi, Princess of Tagaung; Thu Thiri Nanda Dewi, Princess of Khyundaung
Ohnma Dewi, Second Myaukshweye Mibaya	Second Queen of the Northern Gilded Chamber	Unnamed daughter; Thiri Maha Thu Dhamma Yaza, Prince of Nyaungyan; Thado Minhla Sithu, Prince of Nyaungoak; Princess of Kyauksauk
Manla Dewi, Zabwedaung Mibaya		Unnamed daughter; Thiri Thu Ketha Dewi, Princess of Pin; Unnamed son; Princess of Momeik
Konmma Dewi, Khonnaywa Mibaya		Maha Thu Thiri Dhamma Yaza, Prince of Thonze; Unnamed daughter; Unnamed son; Unnamed son; Princess of Myingun; Unnamed daughter; Thado Minsaw, Prince of Pinle; Thiri Pabadewi, Princess of Taungtha; Princess of Padein; Thado Minye Minhtin, Prince of Kothandi; Thiri Thu Wanna Wadi, Princess of Myogyi; Thado Minye Kyawhtin, Prince of Pinya; Princess of Mindat
Thiri Thu Sanda Dewi, Limban Mibaya (လင်ပန်းမိဖုရား)		Thiri Thu Myatswa Yadana Dewi, Princess of Salin; Unnamed son; Unnamed son; Thado Banyar Kyan, Prince of Kyapin (aka Chebin); Thado Banyar Daw, Prince of Yanaung
Ponna Dewi, Yebwe Mibaya		Thado Minye Mingaung, Prince of Maingtong
Thiri Thu Maha Dewi, Thetpan Mibaya		Thiri Maha Dhamma Yaza, Maung Thet-hman @ Prince of Shwegu; Thado Maha Dhamma Yaza, Maung Lwan-thu @ Prince of Mohlaing; Thado Minhla Minkhaung, Maung Pyae-sone @ Prince of Taungnyo
Seywa Mibaya (ဆယ်ရွာမိဖုရား)		Thiri Nanda Wadi, Princess of Kyaukyit
Sanda Dewi, Letpansin Mibaya	Later became Myothit Mibaya	Wunna Wadi, Princess of Yindaw; Princess of Katha; Prince of Myinsaing
Thiri Thama Mahe, Kokkohla Mibaya		Thado Minbya, Prince of Katha
Thiri Manla Mahe, Pyugan Mibaya		Ketha Wadi, Princess of Sawhla; Unnamed son; Thiri Thu Citta Wadi, Princess of Yinge
Thiri Citta Mahe, Thanazayit Mibaya		Unnamed son; Unnamed son; Prince of Kawlin
Tamabin Mibaya		Princess of Kutywa
Thiri Thu Citta Mahe, Hlainggyun Mibaya		Unnamed son; Princess of Taungdwingyaung; Thiri Thu Manla Wadi, Princess of Hingamaw
Thiri Sanda Mahe, Myitsin Mibaya		-
Thiri Nanda Mahe	Daughter of Mone Saopha	Unnamed daughter
Thu Thiri Kalayar, Nganzun Mibaya		Princess of Letmaing; Princess of Myohla; Princess of Htayanga
Thiri Theinga Mahe	Daughter of Legya Saopha	Unnamed daughter; Unnamed son; Unnamed daughter (who was sent back to Shan State with her mother later)
Ruca Mahe	Daughter of Thibaw Saopha	-
Thu Thiri Nanda Mahe, Thayazein Mibaya		Thiri Thu Manla Wadi, Princess of Naungmon; Prince of Ngayane; Thu Thiri Sanda Wadi, Princess of Taingda; Thu Thiri Ketha Wadi, Princess of Mainglon
Thu Thiri Paba Mahe, Htanaungdaing Mibaya		Thiri Theinkha Wadi, Princess of Madaya
Theinga Mahe, Nanoo Mibaya		-
Manla Mahe, Ywathit Mibaya		Unnamed son
Thu Thiri Ruca	Daughter of Kyaingdaung Saopha	-
Citta Mahe, Ngabinzin Mibaya		Unnamed daughter
Migyaungdet Mibaya		Unnamed son
Thu Thiri Wunna, Kyauktalone Mibaya		Princess of Myaunghla
Ywapale Mibaya		Thado Minye Kyawthu, Prince of Htilin
Thu Thiri Sanda Mahe, Magyibinzauk Mibaya		Thu Thiri Pabawadi, Princess of Maingnyaung
Thiri Mingala Mahe, Taungbyone Mibaya		Unnamed son
a Mibaya	Daughter of Theinni Saopha	Prince of Maingyinn
Thu Thiri Paba Mahe, Kyaymyin Mibaya	Daughter of Thado Mingyi Maha Minhla Mingaung, Minister of Yenangyaung	Thado Minye Mingaung, Prince of Pyinmana
Kyaukye Mibaya		-
Htihlaing Mibaya	Daughter of Thado Mingyi Maha Sithu, Minister of Laungshe	Thado Minye Kyawhtin, Prince of Thagaya
Me Hta O	Concubine	Unnamed daughter
Sinde Mibaya		Unnamed son
Yasi Mibaya		-
