= Death and state funeral of Mindon Min =

Death and funeral of King Mindon of Burma

Death and funeral of Mindon Min of Burma
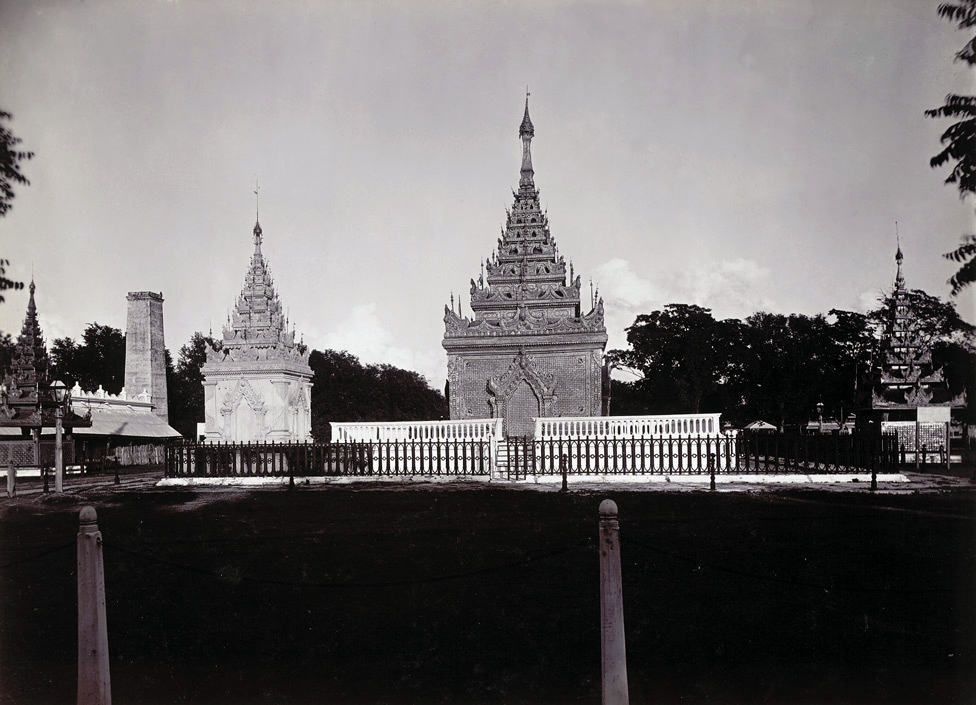
- The tomb of King Mindon in Mandalay Palace in 1903
- Date: 1 October 1878; (date of death); 7 October 1878; (date of ceremonial funeral)
- Location: Mandalay Palace, Mandalay, Burma

Mindon Min, the tenth king of the Konbaung Kingdom, died in Mandalay Palace at the age of 64 on the afternoon of 1 October 1878 (6th waxing day of Thadingyut, 1240 M.E.). A mourning period of seven days preceded his funeral, which took place on 7 October. His son Thibaw was proclaimed the new monarch by the Hluttaw (royal parliament).

Mindon Min was the first to break a tradition of putting cremation ashes into a velvet bag which was then thrown into the river; his remains were not cremated, but instead were buried intact, according to his wishes, at the place where his tomb still stands. Mindon's was the last funeral of a Burmese monarch to take place within the kingdom, since his successor, Thibaw, was dethroned by the British Empire in the Third Anglo-Burmese War and sent to Ratnagiri, India, on 29 November 1885.

== Health issues and death ==
Reigning since middle age, King Mindon's health began to become unstable in his 60s. Since 26 August 1878, the king had been treated for flatulence in a golden chamber on the north side of the Glass Palace under the supervision of Hsinbyumashin, who dominated the king's last days. Other than close companions Taungsaungdaw Mibaya, Seindon Mibaya, Letpanzin Mibaya, Tharazein Mibaya, Lècha Mibaya, Nganzun Mibaya, Thanazayit Mibaya and Palepa Ywaza, no one was allowed to enter the chamber. The king was examined by a royal medical team consisting of Sara Lankara from Sri Lanka, Bawuppakatha and other physicians from across the country.

In September, as meritorious deeds for the king, the following were performed: offerings were donated to every pagoda, Buddha image and Bodhi Tree in the capital; all prisoners were released, regardless of their crimes; birds and fish were set free; and both Buddhist and worldly yadaya rituals were carried out.

After 25 years, 6 months and 25 days on the throne, the king – 64 years, 2 months and 18 days old – died on 1 October 1878 after 2 pm MST. (Note: He died, according to the Burmese method of timekeeping, at 2 o'clock in the daytime (equivalent to 12 noon) and 6 gongs. 60 gongs equal 24 hours.) In the last minutes of his death, the king reportedly kept in mind Buddhist sermons such as the three marks of existence, (Note: Anicca (impermanence), Dukkha (suffering) and Anatta (non-self)) the ten collections of Anussati and the Maranānussati. A list of the king's annual 226-million gold kyat donations was read continuously.

=== Omens of death ===
Many inauspicious events were reported in the days before the king's death. Vultures were seen on the roofs of the left wing of the palace and the Byedaik (Privy Council) Building; bees swarmed around the southern part of the Great Audience Hall; continuous earthquakes rumbled; the turrets of the palace wall suddenly collapsed; water seeped out of the wall of the Kuthodaw Pagoda, built by the king for merit; a tiger roamed into the Mahadhammikayama Monastery; wards in the capital caught fire day after day for over a month; aureole surrounded pagodas in Sagaing and Amarapura; Jupiter rose as a morning star (or turned red); (Note: Burmese: ကြယ်နီ, Kyei Ni; meaning either "the morning star" or "red star") Jupiter and Venus made a close approach to the Moon; unusual atmospheric optical phenomena occurred; a meteor fell from southeast to northwest; without signs of rain, clouds collided and sent out lightning; a person who was mentally ill came into the Nathaphyu (lit. 'sandalwood') Hall where the king used to stay; a dog was born under the palace platform; celestial music was heard above the chamber after 6 pm; nat spirits wept at the second laethee (Note: လည်သီး; structural wall between successive roofs) of the Glass Palace; a natthamee (female spirit) was seen crying in a prone position on the throne at the Glass Palace; the public was heard to be in uproar at midnight; and people in marketplaces became frightened spontaneously.

== Preparation for the funeral ==
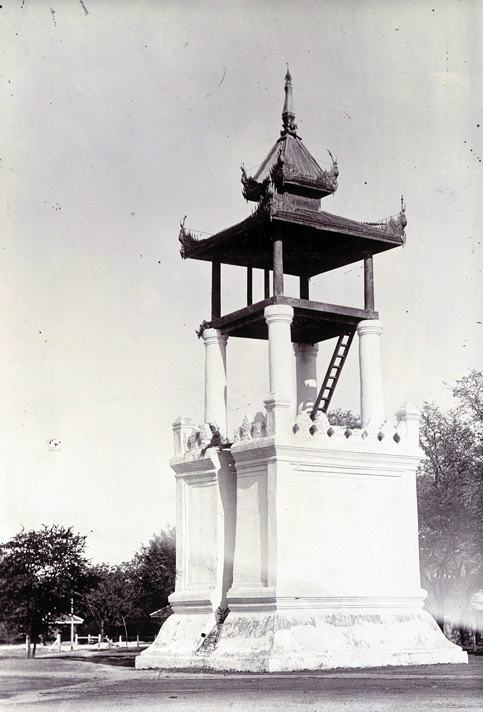
The Clock Tower

As a mark of respect, the Bahozin (Clock Tower) did not run until 8 October; instead, a nayee (set of graduated gongs) was played to show the time. News of the king's death was sent to Pagan Min, his abdicated predecessor, at once.

For the next seven days, all mibayas (consorts), princes, princesses, ministers, officers, and their wives had to wear white clothes as a sign of mourning.

The following letter was sent to Queen Victoria by Thibaw:

Royal Friend! Whilst between the Burmese Royal dominions and the English Ruler's Royal dominions the state of continuous Raja-Mahamit, between two great countries was firm and lasting, sickness fastened upon His Most Great and Excellent Majesty, my Royal Father the Excellent Rising Sun King, against which, notwithstanding that his Minister in consultation with physician prescribed various medicines, he could not be free [or get rest], and on the 6th day of Waxing Moon Thadingyut 1240 of the Burmese Era migrated to the country of the gods-profoundly regretted and mourned by his queens, royal sons and daughters, ministries and by all the people of the country. I believe and hope that the mind of Her Most Great and Excellent Majesty the Queen will be thus [that is, will share in the regret].

=== Bathing rite ===
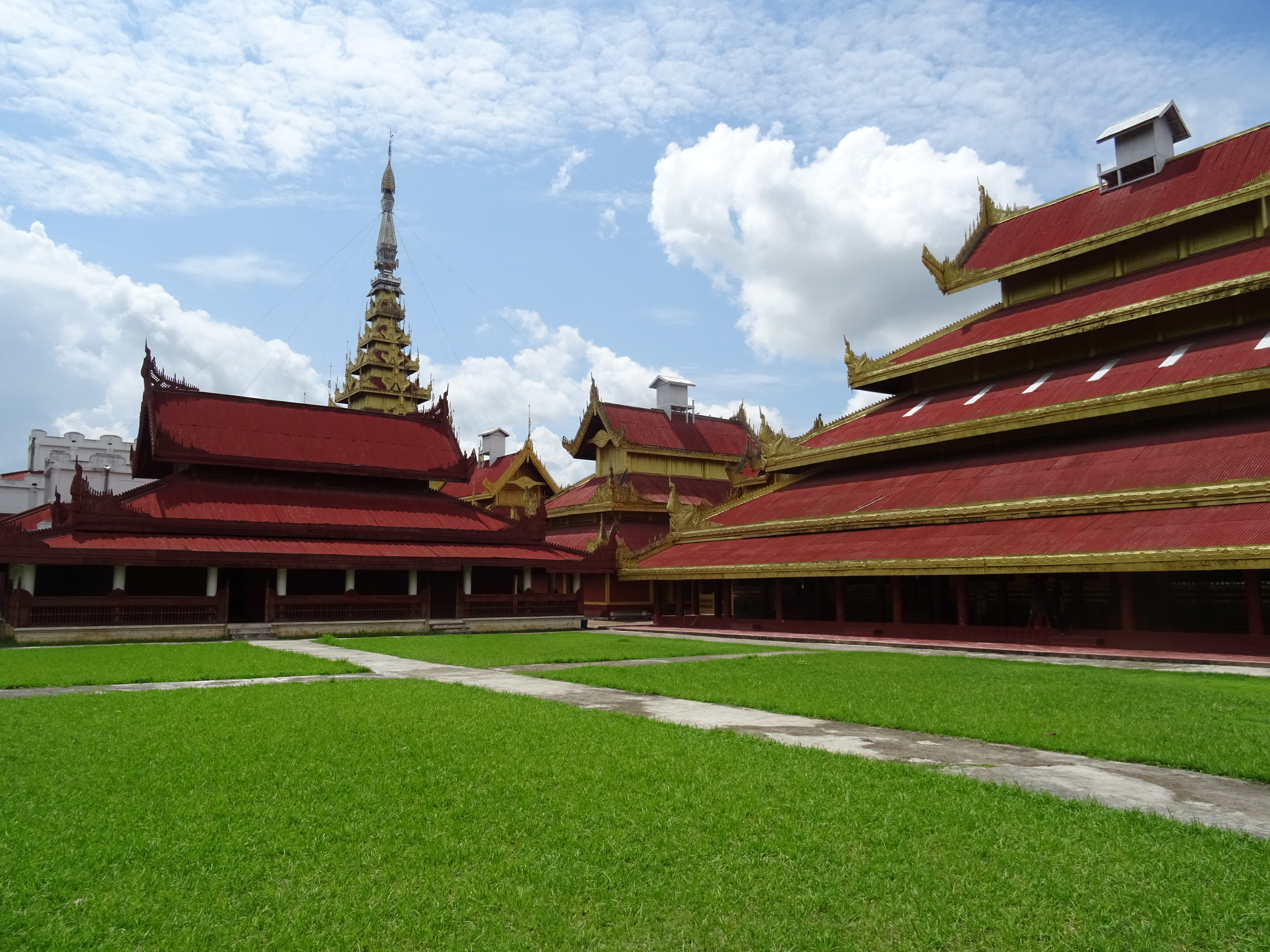
Northern Dawe Chamber

The body of the king was ritually bathed under the direction of his consorts; water was offered by the commander of the northern Dawe Chamber (Royal Guard Room), (Note: မြောက်ထားဝယ်ဆောင်, Myauk Dawe Hsaung; single-storeyed wing on the north side of the palace, with a tiered, vaulted roof) a minister of shields (Note: ဒိုင်းဝန်, Dine Wun; minister in charge of troops who went into combat bearing shields) and a thandawsint. (Note: သံတော်ဆင့်; officer of the court who received and transmitted the king's orders)

=== Construction of tomb ===
Before he died, the king left instructions that his body should be buried and not cremated, thus breaking the time-honoured custom of burning the dead bodies of members of the royal family. Wundauk (Note: ဝန်ထောက်; officer who assisted Hluttaw ministers) Mingyi Maha Minhla Mingaung Yaza, Myoza (Duke) of Yang Aung Myin, and an okewun (အုတ်ဝန်; lit. 'minister of bricks') were ordered to oversee the construction of a mausoleum in the northern grounds of the palace.

== Lying in state ==
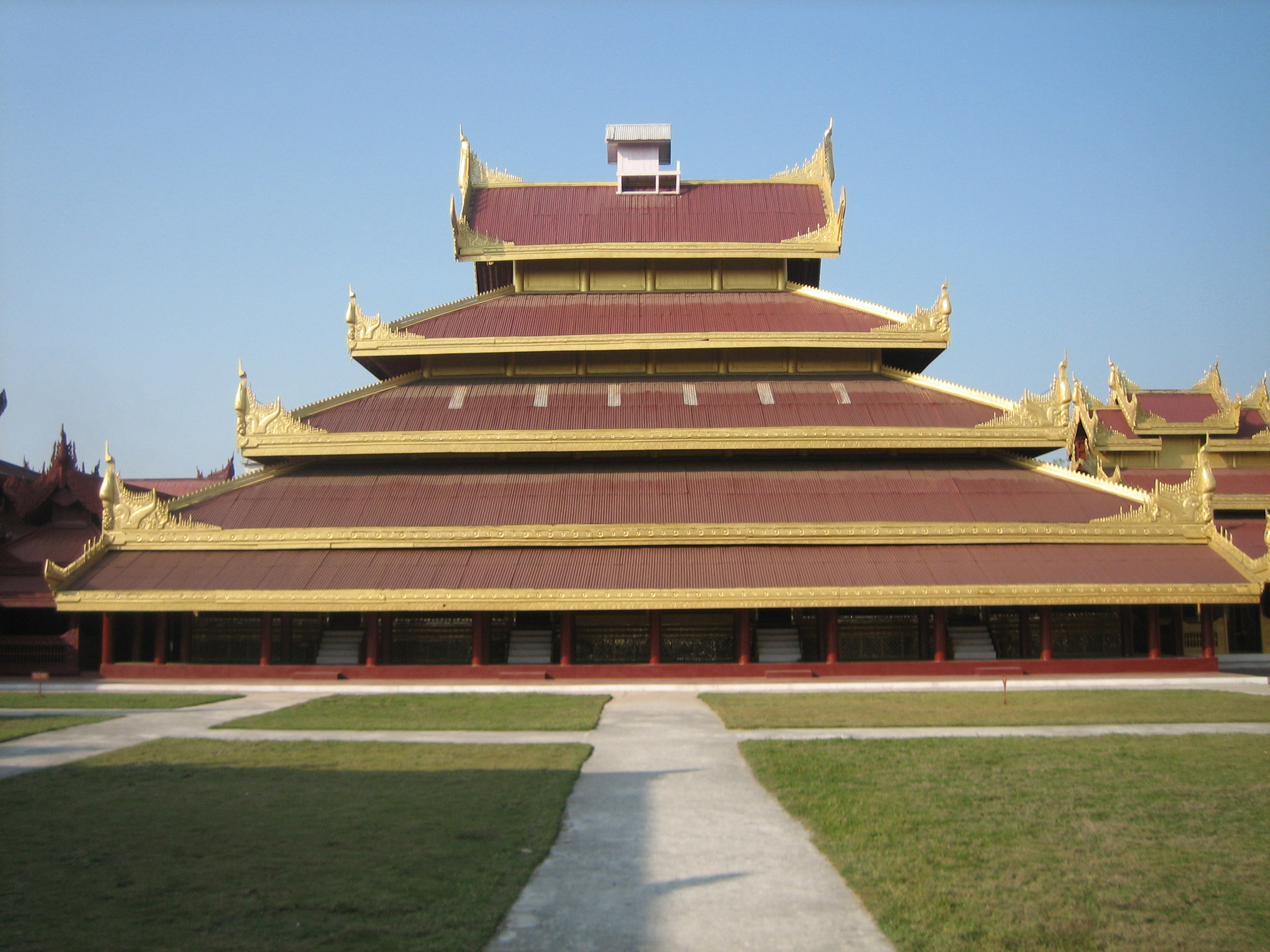
Glass Palace where King Mindon's body lay in state

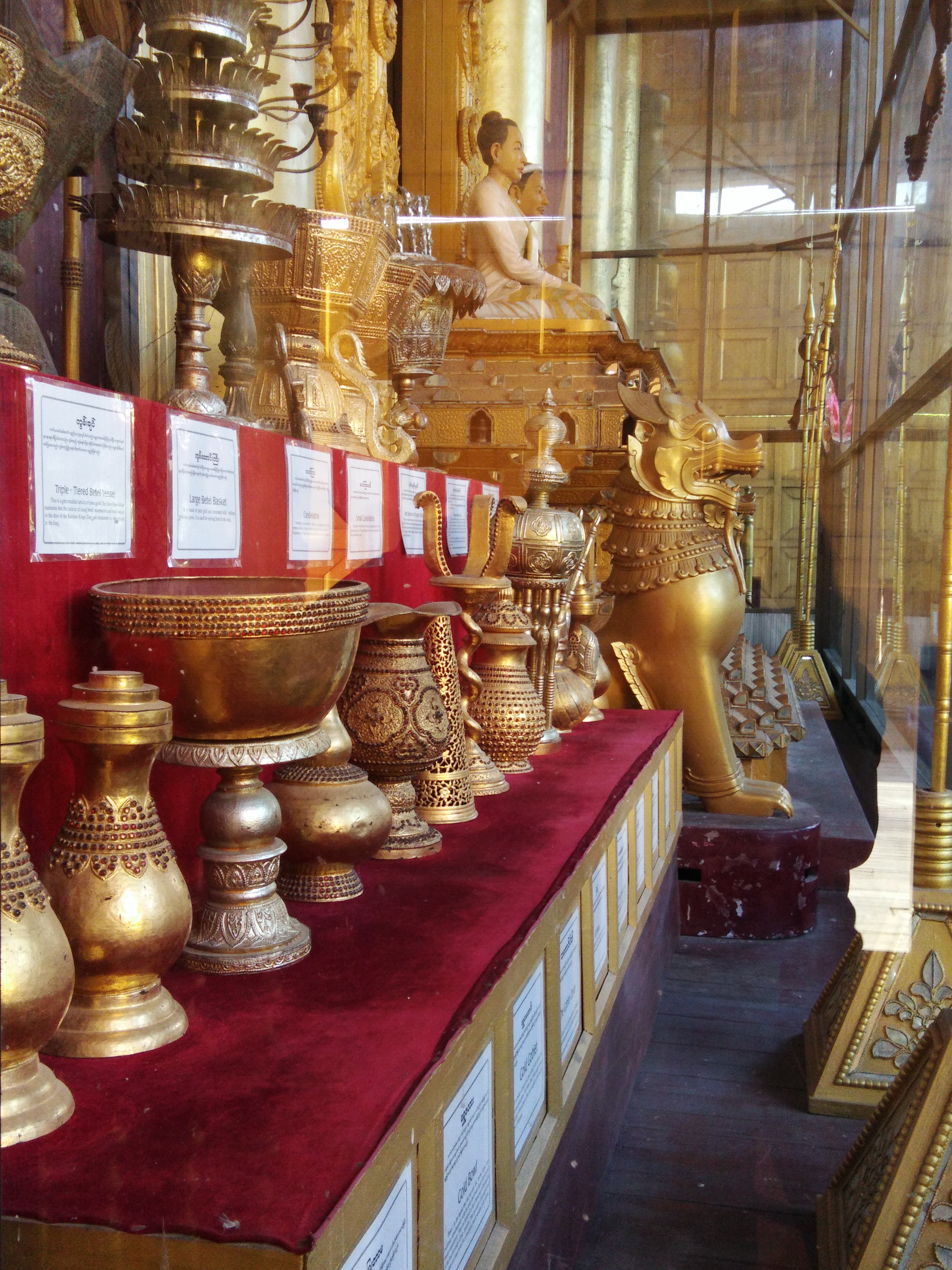
Royal appurtenances displayed beside the throne

The eight hti byus (white umbrellas) on each side of the Lion Throne at the Royal Audience Hall were raised by Minye Kyawhtin, Prince of Hlaingdak, Minye Nara, Prince of Seindon Hléoke, and Minye Minhla, Prince of Pwedaingkyaw Hléoke. Following the instructions from Minye Nyunt, Prince of Swedawoke, a thandawsint, a maha layzedaw, an asaungdawmyè, and a mingann tikesoe (manager of royal appurtenances), the royal appurtenances displayed beside the throne were taken and placed on glass mosaic-embedded four-legged stands to the left side of the body's head.

At noon on 3 October, the lying in state was officially started after opening the 11 doors of the Glass Palace. All gates in the walls leading to the city were opened for the public to pay their respects to the king; however, only the royals who Hsinbyumashin allowed could view the body. The body was housed in a gilded tin coffin which was nested inside a gilded wooden one. The body was dressed to resemble Brahma. On 3, 5, and 6 October, Pagan Min and his queen paid tribute to the late king. Thibaw made daily devotional offerings to his father by sprinkling popcorn and flowers on the coffin.

== State funeral ==
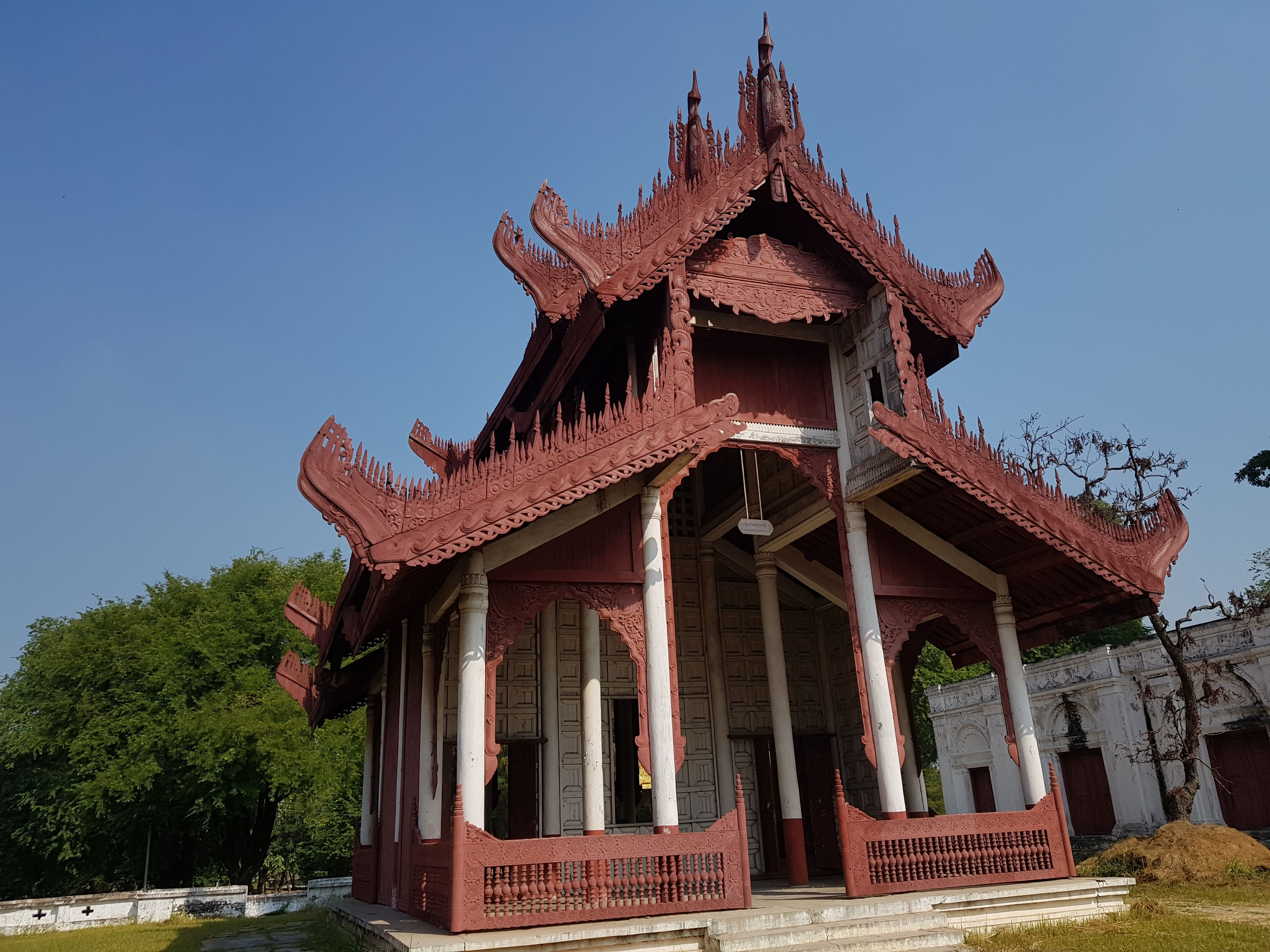
Northern Samote Hall

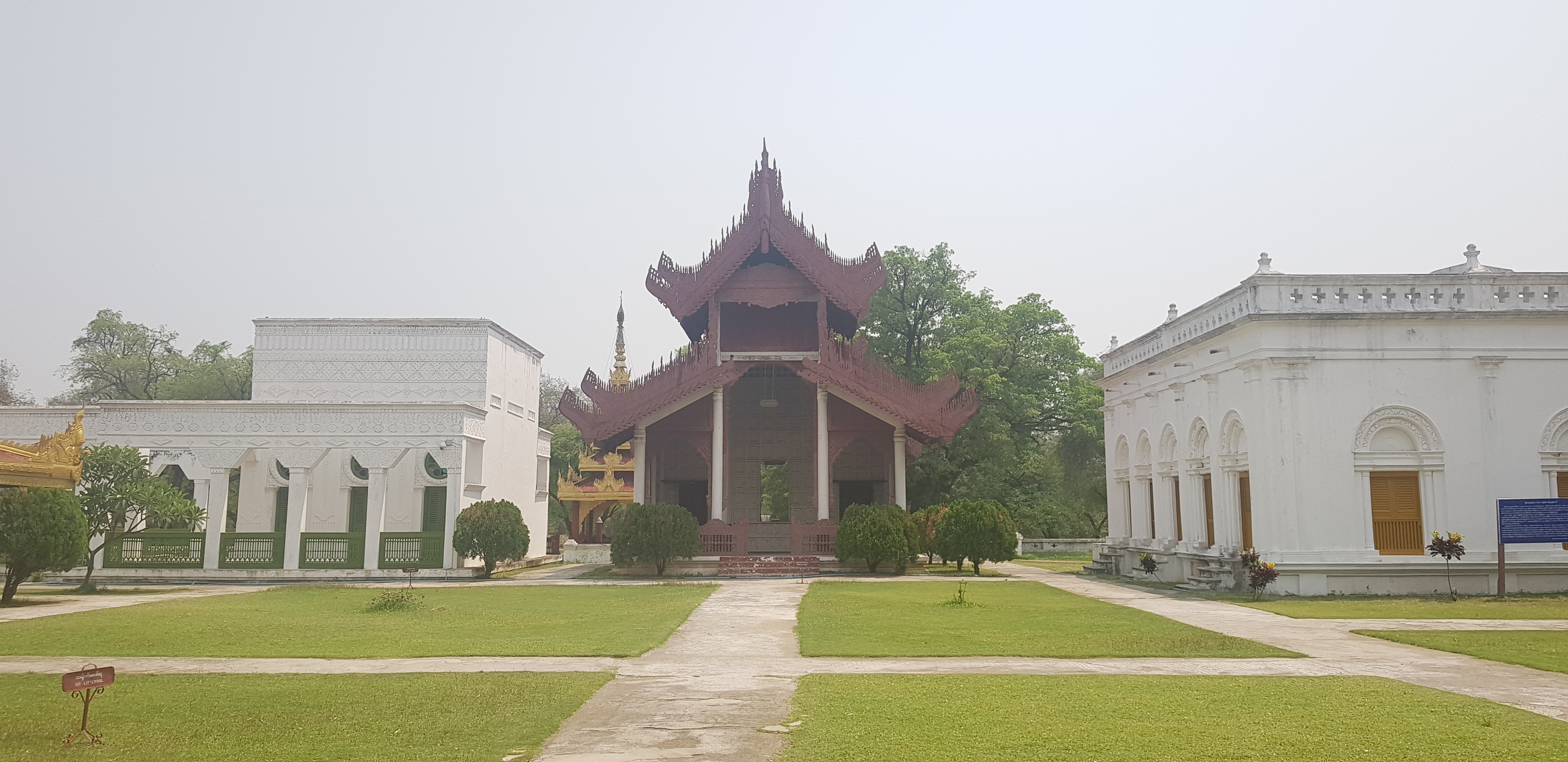
Southern Samote Hall

At 8 am on 7 October, the coffin was placed on a bier and was covered with 8 white htis. Thibaw watched as the bier was carried from the northern stair of the Glass Palace, passing the Central Main Sanu Hall, (Note: နန်းမစနုဆောင် အလယ်ခန်းမ, Nanma Sanu Hsaung Alekhanma; central hall of the main building connecting two main halls) to the Lephetyaydaw Hall, (Note: လက်ဖက်ရည်တော်ဆောင်, Lehpetyeidaw Hsaung; official hall of the 44 lehpetyeidaw – men who are in charge of offering the king lahpetyei (green tea)) and then to the Northern Samote Hall. (Note: မြောက်စမုတ်ဆောင်, Myauk Samote Hsaung; lit. 'Northern gatehouse')

The front of the bier was carried by Mindon's consorts and daughters, Kanaung's daughters, and maids of honour; the middle-class princes, the myinhmue princes and the maha layzedaws were stationed on each side, since all senior princes had been arrested. The procession was monitored by Hsinbyumashin, the Princess of Mai Noung, the Princess of Myadaung, the Princess of Yamethin, the Princess of Salin, the Princess of Meiktila, the Princess of Moemeik and Taungsaungdaw Mibaya in the back. They were followed by other mibayas and princesses, all passing through the western stair of the Samote Hall.

Thibaw wore ceremonial clothing which consisted of a silver magaik (Imperial crown) and a silver duyin with silver jingle bells decorating the lining, which was embroidered with silver silk in the shapes of a star, a jackfruit tubercle and a gourd tendril, in the style of Brahma. He was carried in a palanquin which was placed in front of the Southern Samote Hall, accompanied, in a lower stage of the same palanquin, by the Princess of Hingamaw, the Princess of Madaya, the Princess of Taingda and the Princess of Yingè, two before him and two behind him. This was followed by atwinwuns (lit. 'Ministers of the Interior') and thandawsints holding their daggers and fly-whisks.

As the royal army, on each side of the palanquin, arrived at the southeastern and southwestern sides of the pyre, the palanquin, originally facing north, was turned to the east in order to face the pyre. When the palanquin stopped, Atwinwun Mingyi Minhla Maha Sithu, Myoza of Wetmasut, facing north, called a tinhtein yanhmue, (Note: တင်းထိမ်ရံမှူး; lit. 'officer of curtains') who stood nearby, "Lubyo" (lit. 'virgin') thrice. As the tinhtein yanhmue approached him, the Myoza of Wetmasut, while saying "Nagandaw Khawdaw", went behind the tinhtein yanhmue, then to the coffin. With joined hands he called the Nagandaw, (Note: နားခံတော်; an officer who presented matters to the King for his decision and relayed the decision to those concerned) who was wearing white ornamental ear-plugs and a white gaung baung (turban) and sitting on a lanbitin thinbyuu (lit. '6-foot long beaded mat'), "Khawdaw" thrice. Then the Myoza of Wetmasut referred to Thibaw's statement calling for the late king's body to be interred in the tomb. After the Nagandaw read the statement to the public, Thibaw returned to the palace.

== Aftermath ==
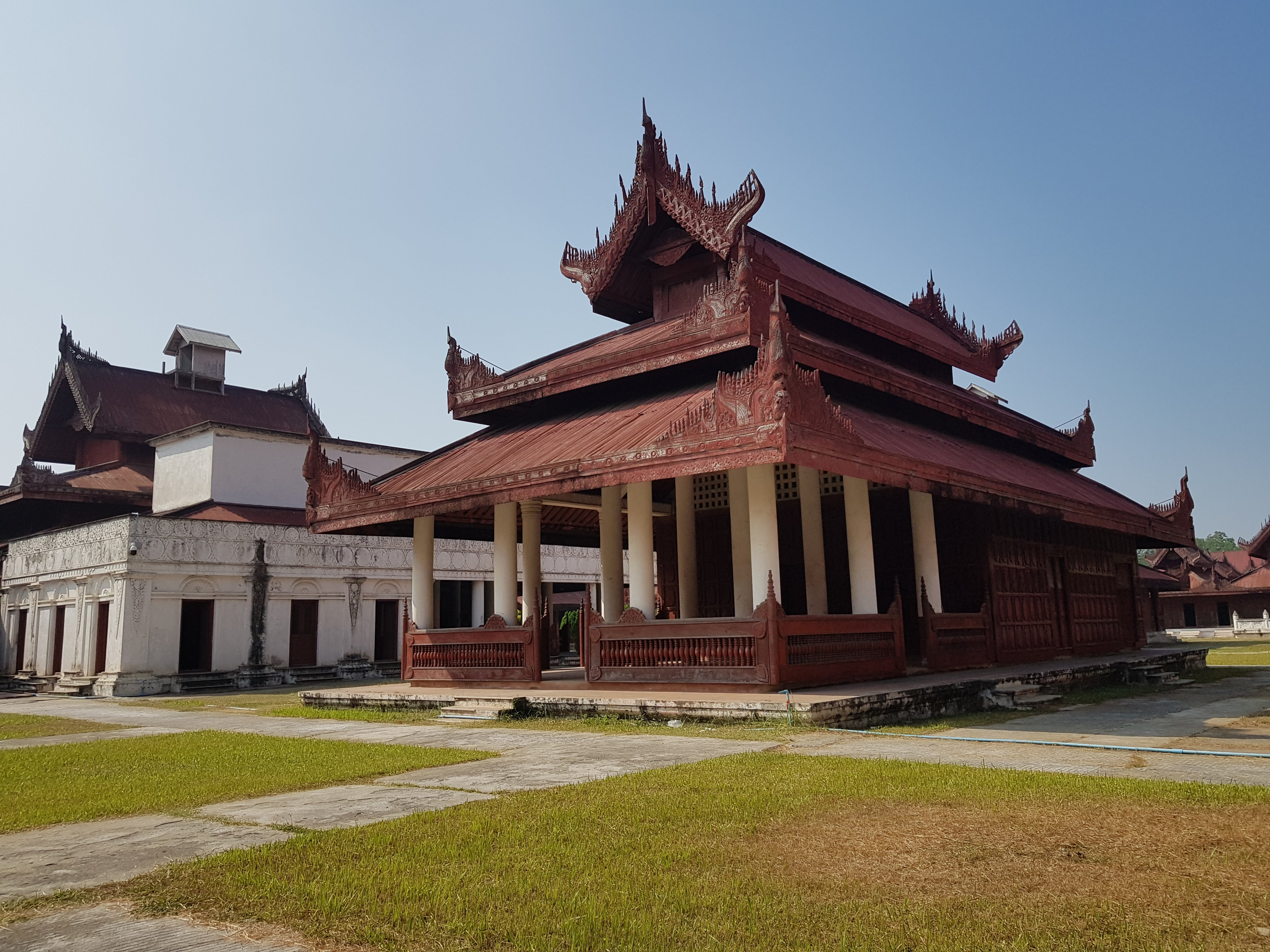
The Tabindaing Chamber

When he returned to the Southern Samote Hall, Thibaw changed his magaik and duyins and cleaned his nails. His hair was washed with traditional tayaw kinpun shampoo by his birthday twins. (Note: နေ့ကျော်သား, Neigyawtha; those who were born on the same day as the king) As soon as she returned to the Tabindaing Chamber, the Princess of Salin, who was designated the future Chief Queen by the late king, joined a Buddhist order of nuns. Three ladies in waiting – Kyauktaw Ywaza, Thazi Ywaza, Thayettaw Ywaza – were jailed for assisting her to do so. After 1 am next morning, an earthquake struck.

== Foreign attendees ==
Foreign diplomats residing in the capital were invited to pay their respects to the late king on 4 October, between 6 and 9 am. Robert Barkley Shaw, the English resident at that time, reported that "several Englishmen attended, saw the body lying in couch dressed as in life, and fanned by the queens and princesses who sat around". Armenian, French, Italian, Muslim and Chinese representatives were also admitted, in that order.

On 6 October, Prime Minister Kinwun Mingyi informed them that the state funeral would be held on the following day. Shaw, together with T. C. Davis, Assistant Resident, James Alfred Colbeck, missionary priest for the Society for the Propagation of the Gospel, and Dr Clement Williams, an English merchant, set out at 9 am. They were later joined by Audreino, the Italian consul.

Shaw chronicled his experience at the funeral for the use of the Government of British India. It was said by Desai, in his King Mindon's Funeral, that Shaw's words unexpectedly became a reference work for students of Burmese history, 80 years after he had written them. Colbeck also wrote about the king's death and funeral in his letters, which were printed later as Mandalay in 1878–1879: The Letters of James Alfred Colbeck.
