= 1879 massacre at Mandalay Palace =

Mass killing of Burmese princes and princesses

Mandalay Palace massacre
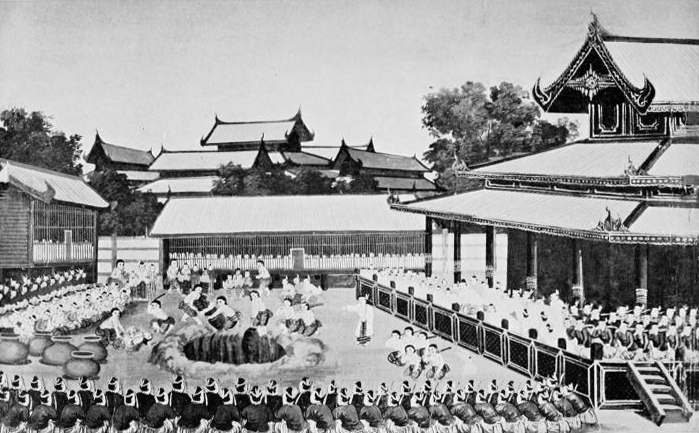
- A painting depicts the massacre at Mandalay Palace by Saya Chone
- Location: Mandalay Palace, Mandalay
- Date: February 13, 1879- February 17, 1879
- Target: Most of the princes and princess who could succeed Mindon Min
- Attack type: Assassination, familicide
- Weapons: bamboo poles swords
- Deaths: over 40
- Victims: Princes, princesses and members of royal family
- Perpetrators: Hsinbyumashin; U Kaung; Taingda Mingyi; Maung Maung Toke

The 1879 massacre at Mandalay Palace (Burmese: ၁၈၇၉ မန္တလေးနန်းတွင်းလူသတ်ပွဲ), occurred on 13, 15 and 17 February 1879 (8th, 10th and 12th waning days of Tabodwe, 1240 M.E.) at the Mandalay Palace. It was one of the most notorious events in the history of the Konbaung dynasty.

Orchestrated by Queen Dowager Hsinbyumashin, it was intended to secure the succession of her son-in-law, Prince Thibaw, and her daughter, Supayalat. During King Mindon's final illness, more than forty princes and princesses were killed by a group of co-conspirators to eliminate potential rivals to the throne.

== Background ==
By claiming for King Mindon's making Prince Kanaung the King Brother a crown prince rather than his senior sons, Myingun Prince and Myinkhondaing Prince attempted a palace coup on 2 August 1866, and Prince Kanaung was murdered during the revolt. Since rebellion caused the king a great reluctance in naming a successor to Crown Prince Kanaung for fear of civil war, he made no one his heir apparent until his death in 1878 which led to the succession crisis.

== Prelude ==
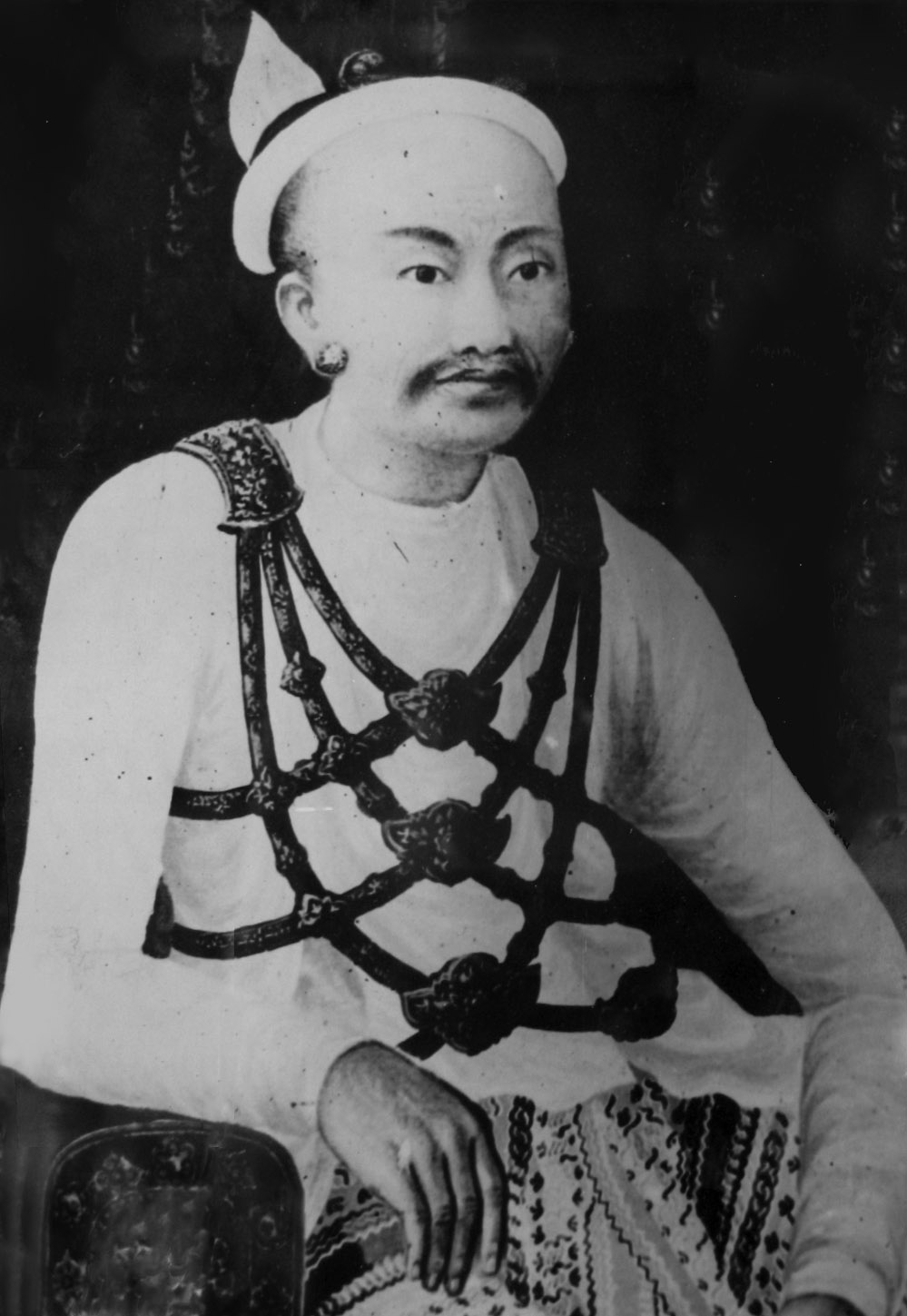
King Mindon

When King Mindon became in ill health and could not manage state affairs since August 1878, all the high-level ministers took an oath to the king and the one to whom he pointed. Queen Hsinbyumashin essentially controlled the nation at the time under her husband's name. As all three of her children were female, she conspired with the prime minister, Kinwun Mingyi U Kaung, to secure the succession for Prince Thibaw, who was in love with her middle daughter, Supayalat. U Kaung also hoped to introduce a constitutional monarchy if Thibaw succeeded to the throne.

According to the testimony of U Aung Gyi, a former secretary to Kinwun Mingyi who was present at the ministerial meeting to select a new king, a meeting was held at the Glass Palace to decide on a successor. Those in attendance included Yenangyaung Mingyi U Shwe So, Khanpat Mingyi U Shwe Maung, Magway Mingyi U Hlaing, Kinwun Mingyi U Kaung, and Queen Hsinbyumashin. The list of candidates included Princes Thonze, Mekkhaya, Thagara, Nyaungok, Nyaungyan, and Thibaw. The four ministers and the Queen cast secret ballots by writing their chosen prince's name on slips of paper, which were placed in a golden bowl. Yenangyaung Mingyi supported Prince Thonze, Magway Mingyi voted for Prince Mekkhaya, and Khanpat Mingyi favored Prince Nyaungyan. Kinwun Mingyi U Kaung and Queen Hsinbyumashin both chose Prince Thibaw, and with their combined support, he was declared king. After Thibaw’s selection, efforts were made to arrest the other princes to prevent any future uprisings.

Under the guise that King Mindon wanted to bid his children farewell, Hsinbyumashin had all royals of close age who could potentially be heirs to the throne seized and thrown into prison by edict on 11 September 1878. Hsinbyumashin summoned every member of the imperial family to the Mandalay Palace without weapons to meet Mindon Min. While they were waiting to see the king, an armed group led by Maung Maung Toke arrested them.

Hsinbyumashin's secret mission was leaked to the second Queen of the Northern Gilded Chamber who made her two sons, Nyaungyan Prince and Nyaungoak Prince, escaped and slipped away to India via British ambassador Colonel Duncan. On 19 September 1878, Hsinbyumashin and her accomplices discussed, and a proclamation making Prince Thibaw the crown prince was announced, without informing the king.

When the king knew the circumstances within a week because of Limban Mibaya, Thetpan Mibaya, Khonnaywa Mibaya and the second Queen of the Northern Gilded Chamber who informed him the situation, they all were released and the king appointed Thonze Prince, Mekkhaya Prince and Nyaungyan Prince as the governors of Chindwin Province, Taungdwingyi Province and Lower Myitsin Province respectively. But, together with some relatives, they were arrested again the following day.

This time, Hsinbyumashin made no one entered the king's chamber, and the Queen of the Southern Apartment, Seindon Mibaya, Lepanzin Mibaya, Tharazein Mibaya, Lècha Mibaya, Ngazon Mibaya, Thanazarit Mibaya and Palepa Mibaya looked after the king.

King Mindon died on 1 October 1878, and King Thibaw ascended the throne after two days.

== Events ==
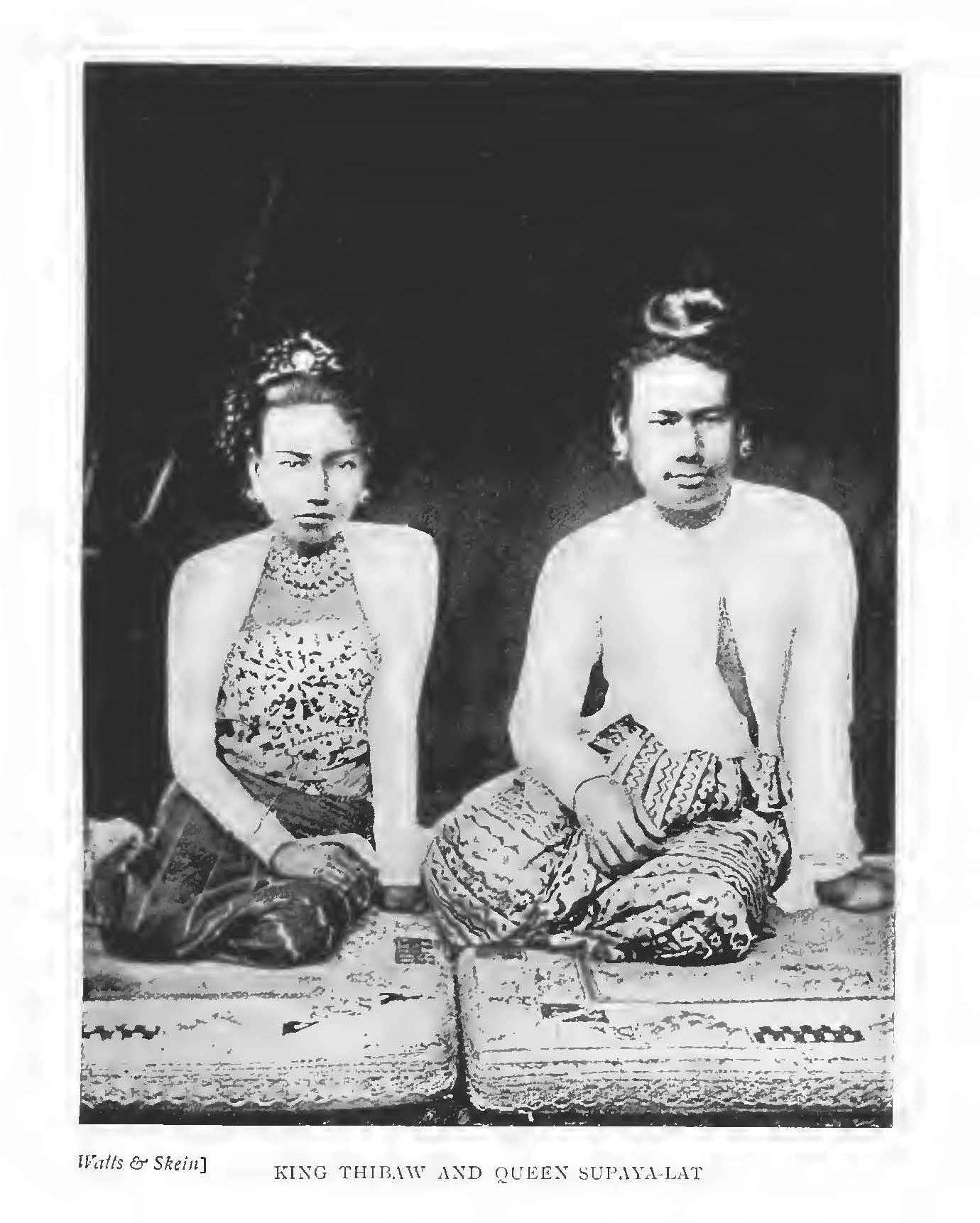
King Thibaw and Queen Supayalat

On 13 February 1879, five royal relatives were killed.

On 15 February 1879, Maung Maung Toke and six other confidants, accompanied by 400 soldiers, removed the royal prisoners who had been confined prior to King Mindon Min's death. They claimed that the Kyedaik (Bronze Hall) was located in front of the King Mother's palace and that suitable apartments for the prisoners had not yet been completed. Nineteen members of the royal family were executed that day. On the following night, another nineteen were killed, some by having their throats crushed with bamboo poles and others by the sword. The decision to kill them by crushing their throats with bamboo poles was made to prevent royal blood from falling on the ground.

The bodies of the princes and princesses, enclosed in red velvet bags, were interred in a pit. To compact the burial ground, elephants were used to trample the earth. During the time of the massacre, the king and queen were watching a traditional court troupe perform a drama in the palace, and they did not notice what was happening because of the noise from the performance.

King Thibaw learned of the case from a report by his mother, Laungshe Mibaya, at the royal parliament on 18 February 1879, and ordered the release of the remaining five princes.

According to Burmese prince and historian Maung Maung Tin, the place where all the princes were executed was not the Bronze Hall but rather the large prison within the criminal court building near the Ywaydawgyi Gate, to the right of the palace's eastern stockade.

== Victims ==
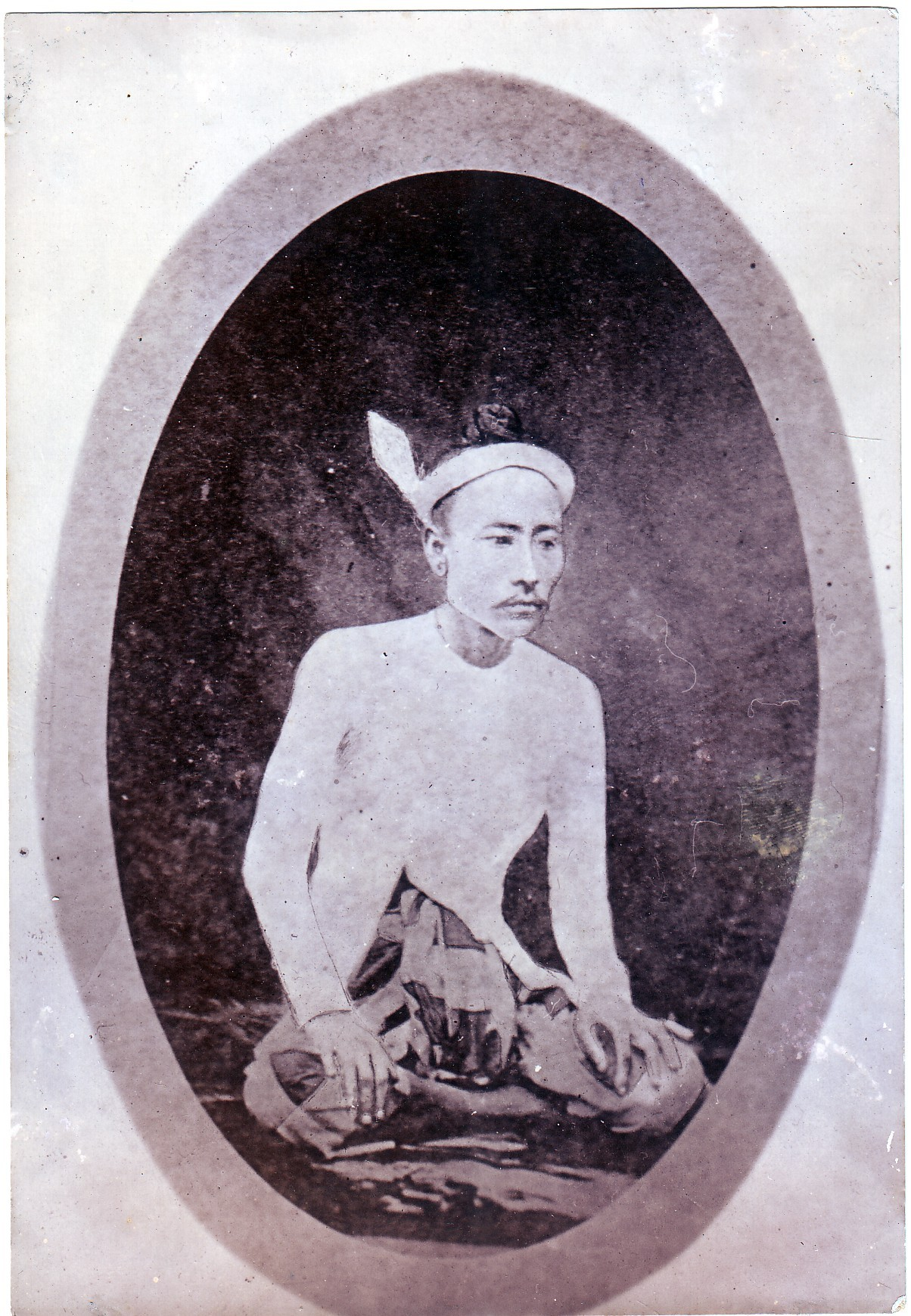
Tapae Prince, cousin of King Mindon, executed despite not being of royal blood

There are differing accounts regarding the number of royals who were executed. The Konbaung Set Yazawin records only about thirty. However, later chronicles differ: the Yadanar Theinkha Maha Yazawin mentions over sixty, while the book From Rantapo to Ratnagiri records more than forty, and both Europe and Burma sources record over eighty.

=== 13 February 1879 ===
1. Maung Boe, Thonze Prince's uncle and the minister of the Bhamo interior
2. Maung Shwe Maung, Yanaung Prince's uncle and the Myoza (Duke) of Yenatha
3. Tabe Prince, Seindon Mibaya's younger brother and the Myoza (Duke) of Tape
4. Myinzugyiwun Maung Tattu, Nyaungyan Prince's uncle
5. Maung Oak, former Rangoon mayor

=== 15/17 February 1879 ===
1. Prince Mekkhaya
2. Prince Thonze
3. Thagara Prince
4. Pinle Prince
5. Pinya Prince
6. Yanaung Prince
7. Taungnyo Prince
8. Moe Hlaing Prince
9. Shweku Prince
10. Katha Prince
11. Wuntho Prince
12. Mongton Prince
13. Mongyai Prince
14. Ngayane Prince
15. Htantabin Prince, son of Kanaung Mintha
16. Queen of the Northern Gilded Chamber II
17. Kanni Princess
18. Kyannyat Princess
19. Mabe Princess
20. Hsinshin Princess
21. A daughter of Prince Nyaungok
22. Two daughters and two sons of Nyaungoak Prince
23. Three daughters and one son of Shwegu Prince
24. 17 unnamed relatives of Prince Mekkhaya

== Response ==
King Thibaw was deeply upset by the massacre and ordered the execution of the Latthonedaws (trusted royal bodyguards), and executioners responsible for the killings. However, Laungshe Mibaya and Queen Supayalat pleaded for their lives, saying that no more blood should be shed within the palace. The king later issued a strict order to the Latthonedaws, stating that in matters concerning the affairs of the state, nothing should be done without his knowledge and authority. In mourning for the loss of his royal relatives, he sponsored extensive religious donations and ceremonies, dedicating the merit to those who had been executed.

In response to the palace massacre, the British government sent a formal letter of protest. The letter described the killings as shocking and horrible, urged that the surviving members of the royal family be spared, and warned that if the executions continued, the British flag would be taken down and the embassy in Mandalay withdrawn.

Kinwun Mingyi responded to the British that this was solely an internal affair, that there was no need to pay attention to outside criticism and that it was simply a matter of one sovereign resolving his own domestic affairs.

== Accusation ==
Main figures responsible for the massacre
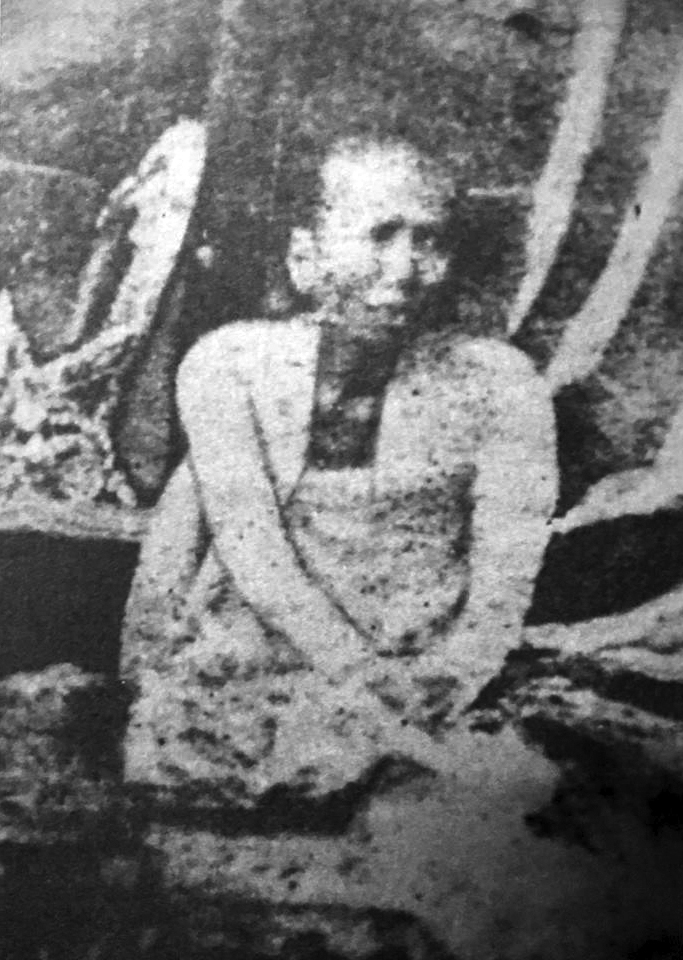
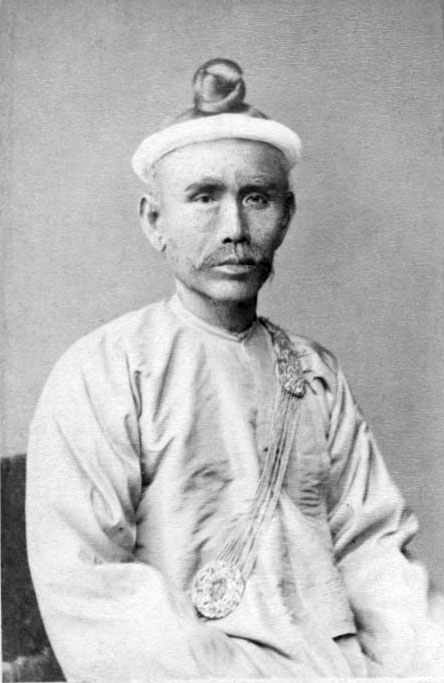
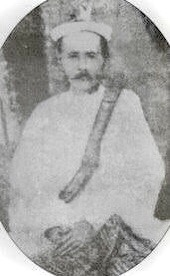
Left: Queen Hsinbyumashin; Middle: Kinwun Mingyi; Right: Taingda Mingyi

Historical evidence indicates that the main figures who gave the orders or bore responsibility for the massacre were Queen Hsinbyumashin and senior ministers such as Kinwun Mingyi, Taingda Mingyi and Hlethin Atwinwun, along with Yanaung Maung Maung Toke.

Sudha Shah, the author of The King in Exile, stated that the main person responsible for the massacre was Hsinbyumashin.

Many historians and media outlets have accused Supayalat of orchestrating the merciless massacre, but she denied the allegation in an interview with the Bandoola Journal in September 1924.

I was a teenager at the time and too young to undertake such an inhuman act. The massacre must have been organized by ministers and officials

— Supayalat

According to the respected Burmese historian Than Swe, Supayalat was aware of the massacre but was not directly responsible for it.

Some accused King Thibaw of being involved in ordering the massacre. King Thibaw denied having ordered or even known about the killings when questioned in an interview by London Times correspondent Moilin during his exile.

Supayalat also denied this accusation on her husband while in Burma after being interviewed by journalists, as recorded in the book Discourse on Supayalat:

(In Burmese): "အဆောင်ရမိဖုရား၊ ကိုယ်လုပ်တော်များက မွေးတဲ့၊ အစ်ကိုတွေ ညီတွေက နန်းလုဖို့ ကြံစည်အားထုတ်ကြတာကို မောင်တော်သိပေမယ့် မကွပ်မျက်ခိုင်းပါဘူး။ အကျယ်ချုပ်နဲ့ထားခိုင်းပါတယ်။ မောင်တော်အမည်ပျက်အောင် ကင်းဝန်က အင်္ဂလိပ်ပယောဂဖြင့် မင်းသားလတ်၊ မင်းသားငယ်တွေကို သတ်ပစ်ခိုင်းတာပါပဲ။ ထိုကိစ္စနဲ့ပတ်သက်ပြီး မောင်တော်က ကင်းဝန်ကို ရာထူးမှ ခဏချထားဖူးပါတယ်။"

(Translation): "Although Maungdaw (King Thibaw) was aware that the princes born of the queens and concubines were attempting to seize the throne, he did not order their suppression. He only instructed that they be kept under close watch. It was Kinwun, acting under British influence, who ordered the execution of the young princes in order to tarnish Maungdaw's name. In connection with this matter, Maungdaw once suspended Kinwun from his position."

— Supayalat, Discourse on Supayalat

Around 1936, some Burmese scholars were quite dissatisfied with certain accounts of Burmese history written by foreigners. Among the accusations made by these foreigners was the charge that King Thibaw was a 'bloodthirsty king'. In addition, some even alleged that King Thibaw was an 'opium addict'.

Harold Fielding Hall, a British author and government official, wrote about the massacre in his 1899 book Thibaw's Queen:

As to who was responsible for that massacre, I do not know with certainty. What I do know for sure is that the young king, Thibaw, and his beloved queen, were entirely innocent in this matter. They knew nothing about it until everything had already been carried out. King Thibaw wept and mourned deeply for his brothers and relatives who had suffered, saying, "If I had known my brothers would meet such a fate, I would never have accepted the throne." He was, in fact, a young man of gentle and tender disposition.

— Harold Fielding Hall, Thibaw's Queen (1899)

== Legacy ==
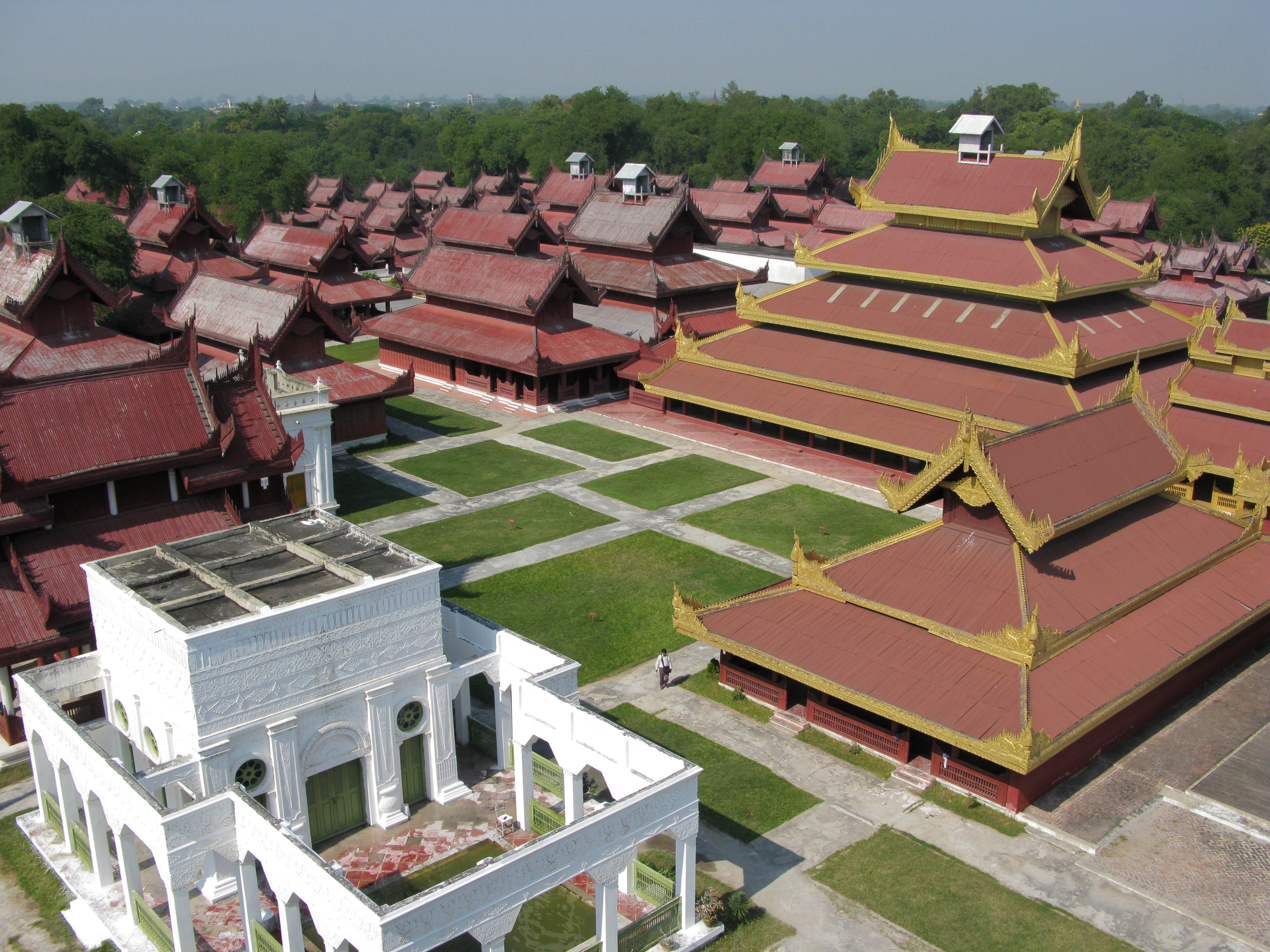
Mandalay Palace grounds, where the massacre took place

Kyedaik (Bronze Hall) is now designated as a restricted area, and no one is allowed to enter except for educational purposes.

Kinwun Mingyi's plan to transform the government from an absolute monarchy into a constitutional monarchy did not succeed, but it nearly materialized through the introduction of a fourteen-department administrative system. Under this system, ministers were made responsible for governing by dividing duties among themselves. However, the system was abolished after only half a year.

== In popular culture ==
- The White Elephant (ဆင်ဖြူတော်), a short thesis film by Burmese CalArts student Thet Chal, was inspired by the events of the massacre.
