= Thetpan Mibaya =

Queen of the fourth rank during the Konbaung dynasty

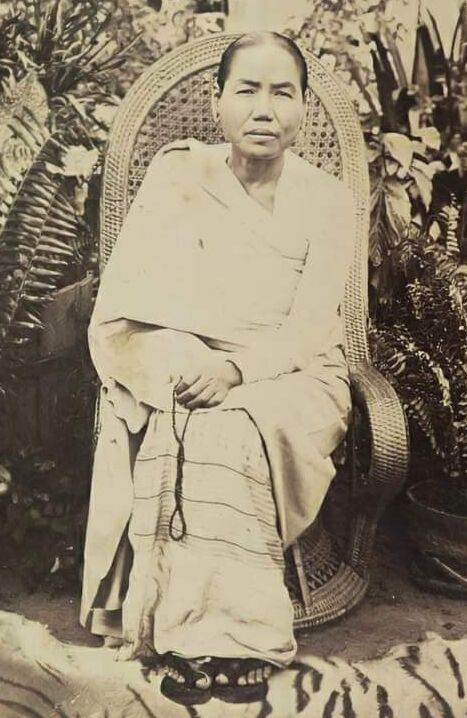
- Thetpan Mibaya during her later years
- Tenure: 1853 — 1878
- Born: Khin Thet; 1832; Amarapura
- Died: 1899 (aged 66–67); Rangoon, Burma
- Burial: Wingabar Yayle Monastery
- Issue: Shweku Prince; Moe Hlaing Prince; Taungnyo Prince
Regnal name
- Thu Thiri Ratana Devi
- House: Konbaung
- Father: Tharbyu
- Mother: Thakingyi Khin-U Shinma

Thu Thiri Ratana Devi, commonly known as Thetpan Mibaya (Burmese: သက်ပန်းမိဖုရား), was a senior queen consort of King Mindon during the Konbaung dynasty of Burma. She rose from commoner status to become a Devi-ranked queen (ဒေဝီဘွဲ့ခံ). Despite giving birth to three sons, her life was marked by tragedy, as all her sons were executed, and she spent her final days as a sorrowful widow.

== Life and family ==
The future queen was born Khin Thet in 1832 to Tharbyu (also Minyon), count of Kanaung and Myanaung and his second wife, Thakhingyi Khin-U Shinma. She was the younger sister of Limban Mibaya. Her father's first wife gave birth to Khin The, and so Limban Mibaya and the Queen of the Northern Palace were half-sisters (shared the same father). When her father died, her mother remarried an official from Kyaukpadaung and gave birth to Tharazein Mibaya, Maung Lay Nge, and Maung Thudaw. As a result, Thetpan Mibaya and Tharazein Mibaya were half-sisters, sharing the same mother. These sisters were of ethnic Mon descent.

== Life in palace ==
The future queen became a kollotaw of Prince Mindon at the age of 14 together with her sister. Upon King Mindon Min's ascension to the throne (r. 1853–1878), Khin Thet was granted the royal title "Thiri Thu Sanda Mahe" (သီရိသုစန္ဒာမဟေ, Sīrisucandāmahe) and became one of the queens of the Royal Treasury (ရွှေတိုက်စာရင်းဝင် မိဖုရား). Later in his reign, she received a higher title, "Thu Thiri Ratana Devi" (သုသီရိရတနာဒေဝီ, Susīriratanādevī), formally recognizing her as a Devi-ranked queen—one of the highest distinctions bestowed upon a queen consort in the Konbaung dynasty. She received the appanage of Thetpan and was therefore known as Thetpan Mibaya (the Queen of Thetpan).

She was part of the queen faction led by Kunitywa Mibaya, which opposed Hsinbyumashin, the Queen of the Central Palace. Other members included Limban and Nanda Dewi, the Second Queen of the Northern Apartment. In 1877, the group petitioned King Mindon to prevent Hsinphyumashin from being appointed the new chief queen following the death of Chief Queen Setkya Dewi. During the final days of King Mindon, Queen Hsinbyumashin wielded considerable influence over court affairs. She ordered the arrest of several princes and installed her protégé, Prince Thibaw, as the heir to the throne. In response, a faction of queens appealed to the ailing king, reporting her irregular actions. However, King Mindon died shortly thereafter, and their appeal was never addressed.

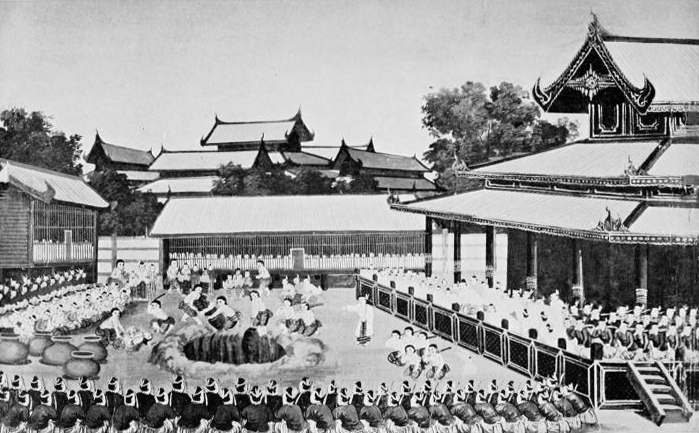
A painting depicting the massacre at Mandalay Palace.

Due to their opposition, Hsinbyumashin harbored deep resentment toward the faction. After King Thibaw ascended the throne, she ordered the arrest of its members. Limban, Thetpan, and Kunnitywa were imprisoned, while Nanda Dewi, the Second Queen of the Northern Apartment, was executed. All three sons of Thetpan, along with their consorts, were executed during the Bronze Hall Massacre—an event in which over 100 members of the royal family were killed—following an edict by Queen Hsinbyumashin to eliminate nearly all potential heirs to the throne. This massacre nearly led to the extinction of Thetpan's royal lineage. A later source suggests that she was fortunate to have a grandson through her younger son, Prince Taungnyo, and his concubine Me Ya, a Thai noblewoman. Me Ya is said to have escaped execution and fled to the Kyaukgaung near the Thai–Burmese border, where the child was born and raised in exile. However, Thetpan and her grandson were never reunited.

Thetpan and Limban were released from prison only two years before the fall of the Konbaung dynasty in 1885. During the British colonial period, these three royal sisters—Limban, Thetpan, and Tharazein—were sent to Rangoon. Queen Thetpan received a colonial pension of 150 rupees, along with an additional 60 rupees for housing allowance. Initially, she lived with her younger sister, Tharazein. However, after Tharazein relocated to another mansion, the widowed Thetpan spent her final years living alone with minimal attendants in her designated residence on Badar Street (now believed to be in downtown Yangon).

Burmese historians describe Thetpan Mibaya as a kind-hearted woman. Despite the fact that all her sons were executed on the order of Hsinbyumashin, she chose to forgive her in her later years and even visited the deposed queen, Hsinbyumashin's mansion to pay her respects. However, others—including Limban Mibaya (whose son had been killed in the Mandalay Palace massacre) and Princess Naungmon—refused to do the same.

Thetpan Mibaya died in 1899 at the age of 67 from gas pains. She was buried near Ngahtatgyi Buddha Temple, at the Wingabar Yayle Monastery.

== Issue ==
King Mindon and Thet Mibaya had three sons: Shweku Prince, Moe Hlaing Prince, and Taungnyo Prince.

== See also ==
- Konbaung dynasty
- List of Burmese consorts
