= Myo Htwe, Prince of Thonze =

Burmese prince (c.1842 – 1879)

Thonze Prince

Thonze Minthagyi
- Reign: 1862 - 1879

Viceroy of Chindwin Province
- Reign: 1878
- Born: c. 1842; Ava
- Died: 1879 (aged 36–37); Mandalay Palace
- Spouse: Yan Aung Myin Princess
- Issue: Four sons
Regnal name
- Maha Thu Thiri Dhammayajza
- House: Konbaung
- Father: King Mindon
- Mother: Konnaywa Mibaya
- Religion: Theravada Buddhism

Maha Thu Thiri Dhammayaza (Burmese: မဟာသုသီရိဓမ္မရာဇာ, Pali: Mahāsusīridhammarājā; born Myo Htwe; c. 1842 – 17 February 1879), commonly known as the Prince of Thonze (Burmese: သုံးဆယ်မင်းသား) or Thonze Minthagyi (Burmese: သုံးဆယ်မင်းသားကြီး), was a Burmese first-ranked royal prince of the late Konbaung dynasty. He was a senior son of King Mindon and the Viceroy of Chindwin Province.

== Early life and career ==
Maung Myo Htwe, the eldest of 13 siblings, was born in about 1842 to the future King Mindon and his consort, Khonnaywa Mibaya. Since his mother was a descendant of Ekkathat, the last king of Ayutthaya, he was a Siamese-Burmese prince. However, there is no direct evidence mentioned of his mother being a descendant of King Ekkathat or King Udumbara in the Burmese Chronicle.

When his father ascended the throne, on 26 August 1853, he received the title of Thado Minsaw, and was granted the appanage of Laungshe. On 13 March 1854, he received the appanage of Thonze, and then became known as the Prince (or Myoza) of Thonze (Duke of Thonze).

In July 1854 when he was 12 years old, he underwent the Yaungdonbwe where he had his hair tied in a topknot and the Shinbyu (Coming of age) ceremonies, together with the princes of Malun, Myingun and Padein. On 15 June 1862 when he was 20, he married Yan Aung Myin Princess, a daughter of Kanaung Mintha and his consort, Khin Kye.

== Later years ==
At the Wa-gyut Gadaw ceremony in 1862, he received the title of Maha Thu Thiri Dhammayaza from his father. He was promoted to Minthagyi (lit. 'Great Prince'), and was thereafter known as Thonze Minthagyi.

He traveled to Pegu and Rangoon on 21 March 1863. When he returned to the palace, with the help of his father, he founded the Royal Diocesan High School (present-day No. 10 Basic Education High School, Mandalay) for the royal princes.

When King Mindon fell ill in 1878, he and other senior princes who could potentially be heir to the throne were seized and thrown into prison by Hsinbyumashin who dominated the king's last days. The king was informed of the situation within a week; Thonze Prince was released and was appointed as the Viceroy of Chindwin Province. But he was arrested again the following day.

He was executed on 17 February 1879 as part of the royal massacre and buried in the palace grounds.

== Bibliography ==
- Maung Maung Tin, U (October 2004). Konbaung Set Yazawin (Chronicle of Konbaung Dynasty) (in Burmese) (4th ed.). Yangon: Department of Universities History Research, University of Yangon.
- Khin Khin Lay, Dagon (December 2003). The Beginning and the Ending of Yadanabon (ရတနာပုံ၏ နိဒါန်းနှင့် နိဂုံး) (in Burmese). တော်ဝင်မြို့မ စာအုပ်တိုက်.
- Sein Tin, Tekkatho (June 2005). King Thibaw and Supayalat (သီပေါဘုရင်နှင့် စုဖုရားလတ်) (in Burmese) (1st ed.). အားမာန်သစ်စာပေ.
