= Limban Mibaya =

Queen of the fourth rank during the Konbaung dynasty

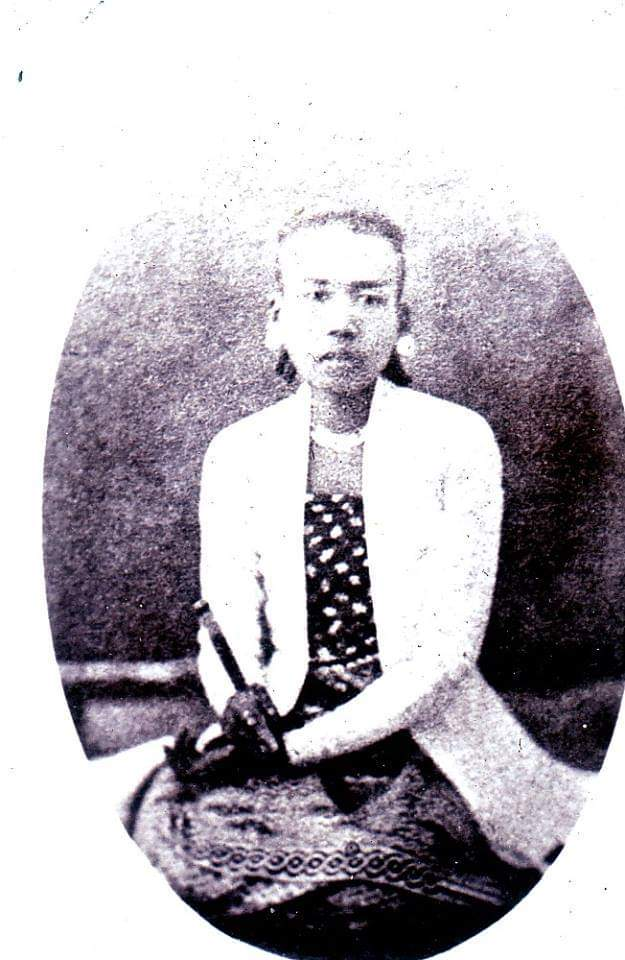
- Limban Mibaya
- Tenure: 1853 — 1878
- Born: 1830; Amarapura
- Died: 1893 (aged 62–63); Rangoon, Burma
- Burial: Ngahtatgyi Buddha Temple
- Issue: 4 sons and a daughter including Salin Supaya
Regnal name
- Sīrisucandādevī
- House: Konbaung
- Father: Tharbyu
- Mother: Thakhingyi Khin-U Shinma

Thiri Thu Sandar Dewi (သီရိသုစန္ဒာဒေဝီ; Sīrisucandādevī), commonly known as Limban Mibaya (Burmese: လင်ပန်းမိဖုရား), was a queen of the fourth rank of King Mindon during the Konbaung dynasty in Burma. She was one of the queens of the Royal Treasury (ရွှေတိုက်စာရင်းဝင် မိဖုရား) and later promoted to Devi-ranked queen—one of the highest distinctions bestowed upon a queen consort in the Konbaung dynasty.

== Life and family ==
Limban Mibaya was born in 1830 to Tharbyu (also Minyon), mayor of Kanaung and Myanaung and his second wife Thakhingyi Khin-U Shinma. She was the elder sister of Thetpan Mibaya.

Her father's first wife gave birth to Khin The, and so Limban Mibaya and the Queen of the Northern Palace were half-sisters (having the same father).

When her father died, her mother married an officer of Kyaukpadaung and gave birth to Tharazein Mibaya, Maung Lay Nge, and Maung Thudaw. Thus, Limban Mibaya and Tharazein Mibaya were also half-sisters (sharing the same mother).

== Life in palace ==
Limban Mibaya became a kollotaw of Prince Mindon, at the age of 16. When King Mindon ascended the throne, she became a fourth-rank queen and received the appanage of Limban and later received Bamaw and Magway.

She was part of the queen faction led by Kunitywa Mibaya, which opposed Hsinbyumashin, the Queen of the Central Palace. Other members included Thetpan and Nanda Dewi, the Second Queen of the Northern Apartment. In 1877, the group petitioned King Mindon to prevent Hsinphyumashin from being appointed the new chief queen following the death of Chief Queen Setkya Dewi. During the final days of King Mindon, Queen Hsinbyumashin wielded considerable influence over court affairs. She ordered the arrest of several princes and installed her protégé, Prince Thibaw, as the heir to the throne. In response, a faction of queens appealed to the ailing king, reporting her irregular actions. However, King Mindon died shortly thereafter, and their appeal was never addressed.

Due to their opposition, Hsinbyumashin harbored deep resentment toward the faction. After King Thibaw ascended the throne, she ordered the arrest of its members. Limban, Thetpan, and Kunnitywa were imprisoned, while Nanda Dewi, the Second Queen of the Northern Apartment, was executed. Her younger son Yanaung Prince, along with his consorts, were executed during the Bronze Hall Massacre—an event in which over 100 members of the royal family were killed—following an edict by Queen Hsinbyumashin to eliminate nearly all potential heirs to the throne. Limban and her eldest son Kyapin Prince were released from prison only two years before the fall of the Konbaung dynasty in 1885. Her daughter, Salin Supaya, shaved her head and entered the Buddhist order of nuns permanently, immediately after her father, King Mindon, was entombed.

After the fall of the Konbaung dynasty, the British government transferred Limban to Rangoon along with her son, Prince Kyapin, and two grandsons born to his concubines. She was allowed to reside in a royal mansion near the Coffee Grove Estate. She was recognized as a second-rank queen and received a monthly allowance of 150 rupees, along with 60 rupees for housing. Later, her pension was increased to 210 rupees per month. Due to the disturbances at her initial assigned royal residence, she was later relocated to a quieter mansion near the Shwedagon Pagoda.

While residing in Rangoon, Limban learned that Hsinbyumashin, the deposed queen, had also taken up residence there. Though other former queens and princesses went to pay their respects, Limban—still consumed by grief and resentment over the execution of her son in the Mandalay Palace massacre—refused to visit her. However, following Limban's death, Hsinbyumashin donated eleven kāṣāyas (monastic robes) in her memory—a gesture of merit-making that contrasted with their bitter past.

Limban Mibaya died in 1893, and was buried at Wingabar mound of Ngahtatgyi Buddha Temple.

== Issues ==
King Mindon and Limban Mibaya had four sons and a daughter, but second and third sons did not survive– only Salin Supaya, Kyapin Prince and Thiri Thu Dhammaraja Yanaung Prince alive to adulthood.

Her eldest daughter, Salin Supaya, was the Tabindaing Princess (chief queen designate) during the reign of King Mindon.

As the saying goes "Son Kyapin, daughter Salin," children of Limban Mibaya were the favorites of King Mindon.

== See also ==
- Konbaung dynasty
- List of Burmese consorts
