= Taingda Mingyi U Pho =

Burmese official (d. 1896)

U Pho ဦးဘိုး
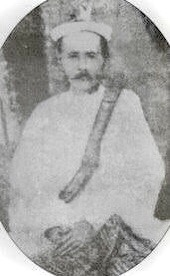
- Photograph c. 1880

Member of the Legislative Council of Burma
- In office December 1885 – c. 1886
- Preceded by: Position established
- Succeeded by: Unknown

Senior Minister of the Hluttaw
- In office 23 March 1883 – 30 November 1885
- Monarch: Thibaw Min
- Preceded by: Unknown
- Succeeded by: Position disestablished

Lord of Taingda
- In office 22 January 1879 – 30 November 1885
- Monarch: Thibaw Min
- Preceded by: Taingda Princess
- Succeeded by: Position disestablished

Personal details
- Born: c. 1820s Konbaung Burma
- Died: 31 May 1896; Sunday, 6th waning of Nayon 1258 ME Rangoon, British Burma

Military service
- Allegiance: Konbaung dynasty
- Branch/service: Royal Burmese armed forces
- Years of service: ?–1885
- Rank: Agga Maha Thenapati (Commander in chief)
- Commands: Southern Tavoy Regiment

Taingda Mingyi U Pho (Burmese: တိုင်တား မင်းကြီး ဦးဘိုး, pronounced [táiɰ̃dà mɪ́ɰ̃dʑí ʔú pʰó]; c. 1820s – 31 May 1896) was a Burmese official of the royal courts of King Mindon and King Thibaw during the Konbaung dynasty. He became the most powerful official at King Thibaw's court and held several key positions, including Minister of the Interior, Minister of Defense, and Senior Minister of the Hluttaw. Taingda was seen as an opponent of Kinwun Mingyi U Kaung and the leader of the conservative faction that advocated for war with the British.

== Life ==
Maung Pho was born into minor nobility who served in the newly conquered kingdom of Arakan during the reign of King Bodawpaya. His father, Maha Mingyi Kyawswa, was governor of Sandoway (Thandwe). His date of birth is not known. He was appointed to the position of royal tea official (လက်ဖက်ရည်တော်) shortly after King Mindon ascended to the throne. Later he held several positions, such as second-in-command of the military unit for Salin, Saku, Kyapin, and Legaing; governor of Mindon and seven hill districts, commander of the Southern Tavoy Regiment, count of Monglon.

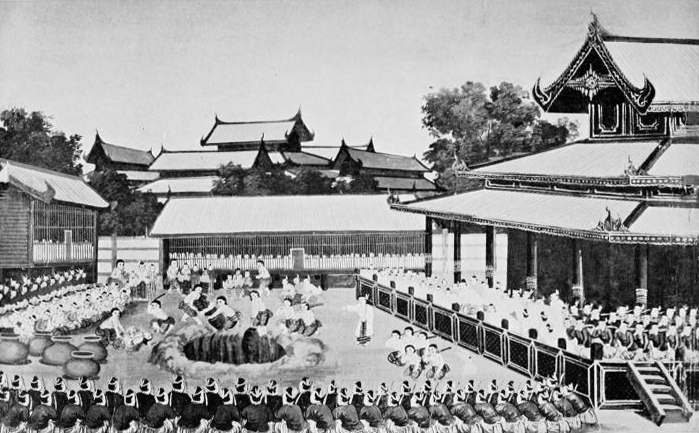
A painting depicting the massacre at Mandalay Palace

When King Mindon died in 1878, U Pho felt powerful enough to offer the throne to the late king's son, Prince Thibaw. He played a major role in the massacre of around forty members of the Burmese royal family. He was an ally of Queen Hsinbyumashin, who ordered almost all possible heirs to the throne to be killed, so that her daughter Supayalat and son-in-law Thibaw Min would become queen and king. In return, King Thibaw soon after his accession to the throne appointed him the Thuye Wun (Minister of the Elite Infantry) with the title of Mingyi Minkhaung Maha Kyawhtin on 23 November 1878. On 22 January 1879, he was appointed the Minister of the Interior and granted the appanage of Taingda (a town between Sidoktaya and Minbu) and became known as Taingda Mingyi (Lord of Taingda). On 23 March 1883, he was promoted to Agga Maha Thenapati Wungyi (Minister of Defense), while also serving as Thamidaw Wun (lit. "Minister of the Royal Daughter").

Right after the Third Anglo-Burmese War, Taingda briefly served in the incoming British administration. He and Kinwun were the first two Burmese to be appointed to the Legislative Council of Burma. However, the British soon detained Taingda, charging him with creating unrest in the country, and exiled him to Cuttack, Odisha State, India. In 1890, the British sent him back to Burma.

He died on 31 May 1896 (Sunday, 6th waning of Nayon 1258 ME) in Rangoon (Yangon).

== Bibliography ==
- Maung Maung Tin, U (1905). Konbaung Set Yazawin (in Burmese). Vol. 1–3 (2004 ed.). Yangon: Department of Universities History Research, University of Yangon.
