= Tharazein Mibaya =

Queen of the fourth rank during the Konbaung dynasty

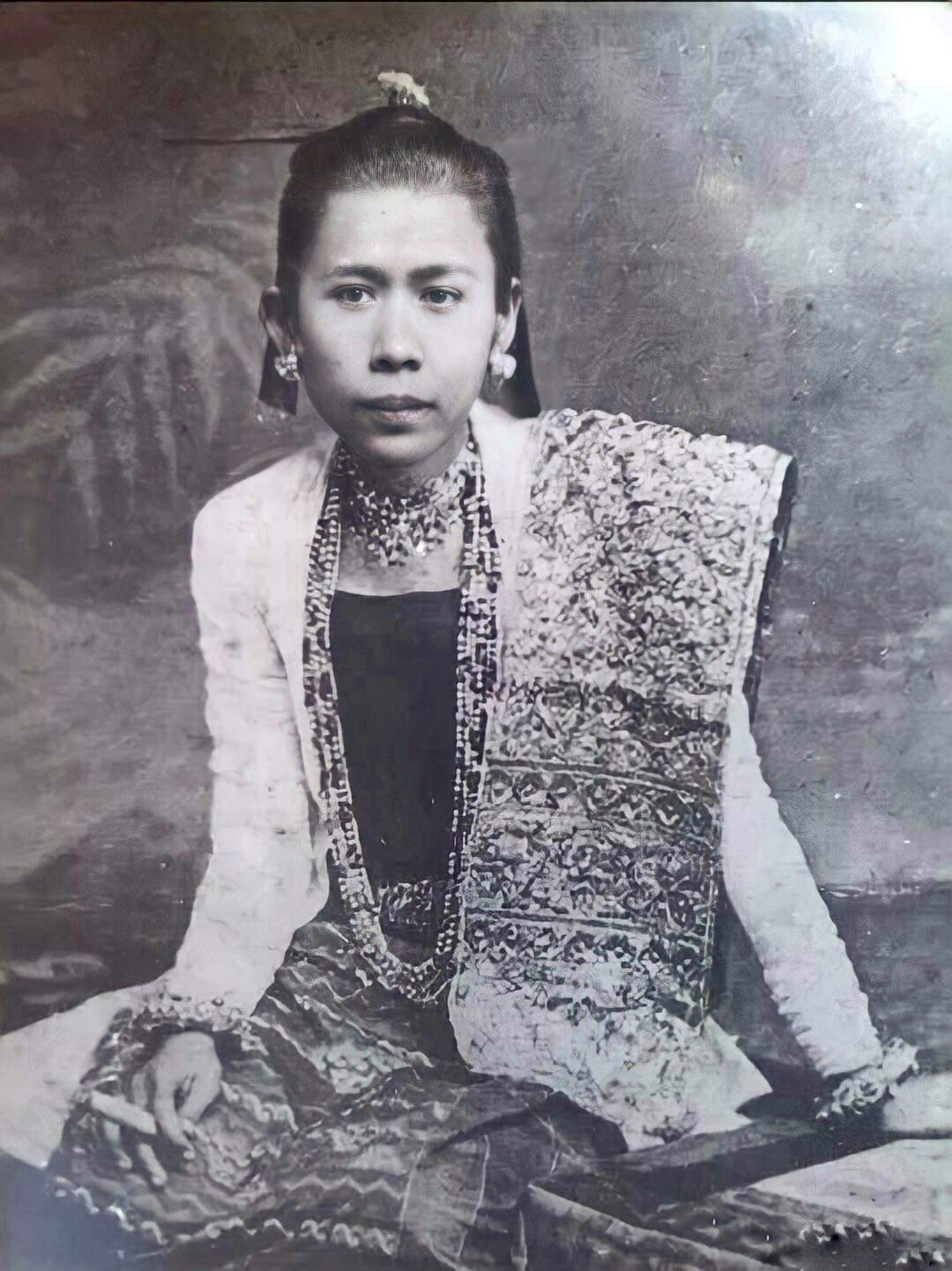
- Tharazein Mibaya

Mibaya of Myotha and Tharazein
- Tenure: 1853 — 1878
- Born: 1842; Amarapura
- Died: c.1925 (aged 83); Rangoon, Burma
- Spouse: Mindon Min
- Issue: Naungmon Princess; Ngayane Prince; Taingda Princess; Mainglon Princess
Regnal name
- Thiri Thu Nandar Mahe
- House: Konbaung
- Father: Shwe Kyi, Count of Kyakpadaung
- Mother: Thakingyi

Thiri Thu Nandar Mahe, commonly known as Tharazein Mibaya (also spelt Tharasein Mibaya, Burmese: သရစိမ်းမိဖုရား), was a queen of the fourth rank of King Mindon during the Konbaung dynasty. Being one of the favorite wives of King Mindon, she was appointed a custodian of royal treasures and properties.

== Life ==
Tharazein Mibaya was born to Shwe Kyi, Count of Kyaukpadaung, and his wife Thakhingyi. Her mother's first husband was Tharbyu, Count of Kanaung and Myanaung. They had two daughters, Limban Mibaya and Thetpan Mibaya, and so Tharazein Mibaya was a half-sister of Limban and Thetpan, in that they shared the same mother. When Mindon ascended the throne, she became a fourth-rank queen with her half-sisters and received the appanage of Myotha and Tharazein (Note: Tharazein was a town, now a village between Sadaung and Wetlet.) in 1853.

On 26 August 1878, the King Mindon was treated for flatulence in a golden chamber on the north of the Glass Palace, under supervision of his favorite queens including Tharazein Mibaya, Hsinbyumashin, Taungsaungdaw Mibaya, Seindon Mibaya, Letpanzin Mibaya, Lècha Mibaya, Nganzun Mibaya, Thanazayit Mibaya and Palepa Mibaya, no one was allowed to enter the chamber.

She escaped the massacre at Mandalay Palace of upward of 100 members of the royal family, following an edict by Hsinbyumashin that ordered the killing of almost all possible heirs to the throne. After the fall of the Konbaung dynasty, the British government deported Tharazein and her daughters to Rangoon on 28 February 1886.

== Issues ==
King Mindon and Tharazein Mibaya had three daughters, the Naungmon, Mainglon and Taingda Princesses, as well as a son, the Ngayane Prince, who died young.

== Legacy ==
On 23 September 1944, Lancaster Road in Rangoon where she settled down was renamed Tharazein Road. It was later renamed Nawade Road in honor of Nawade.

== See also ==
- Konbaung dynasty
- List of Burmese consorts
