= Khin The =

Khin The Sirimahāratanamaṅgaladevī
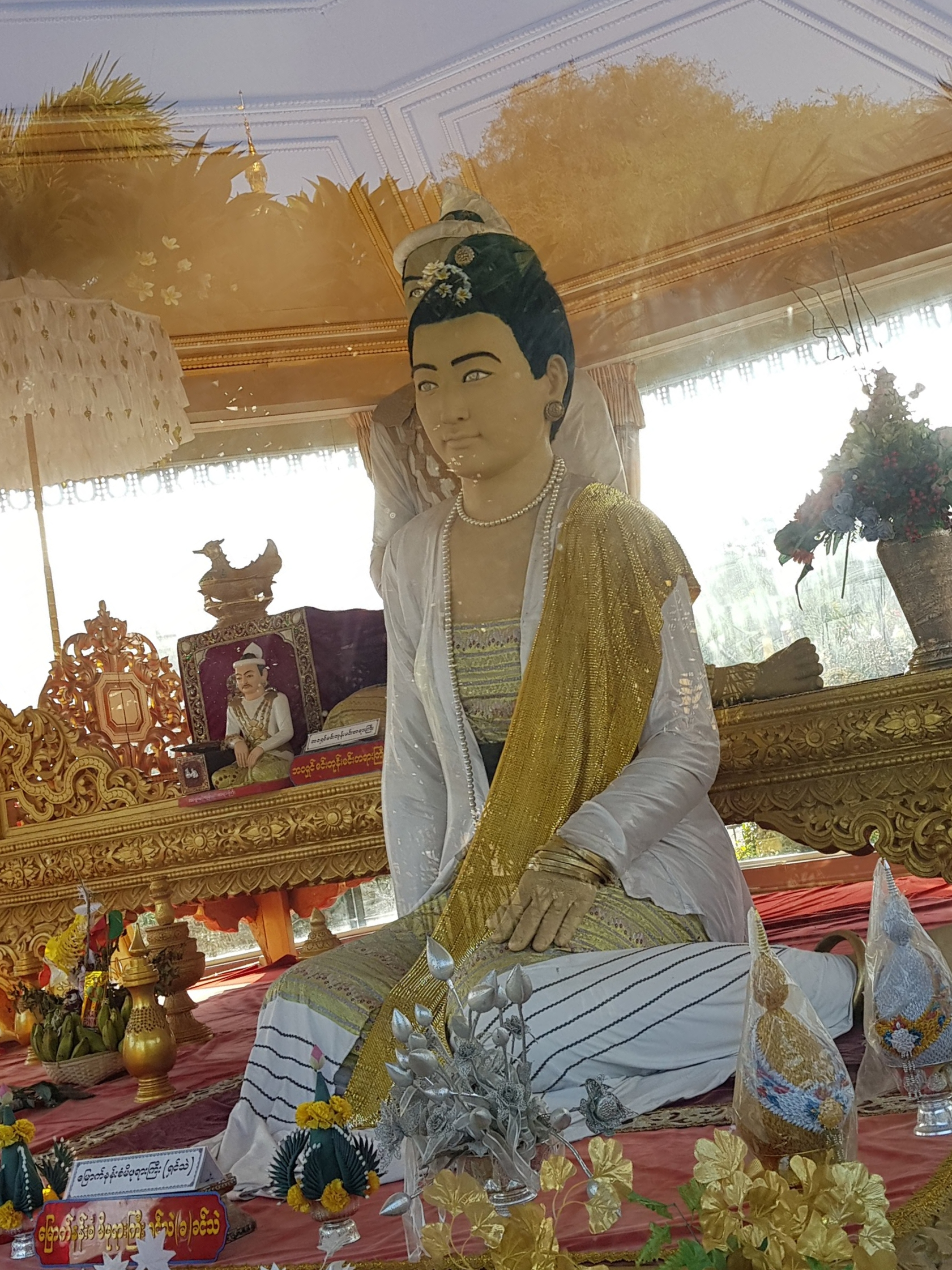
- Statue of Khin The

Queen of the Northern Palace
- Tenure: 26 March 1853 – 3 May 1872
- Coronation: 6 April 1853
- Predecessor: Thiri Maha Yadana Dewi II
- Successor: Supayalat
- Born: Me Nyunt; December 1813 or January 1814; Pyatho 1175 ME (Note: Pyatho 1175 ME = 22 December 1813 to 20 January 1814 Her birth name, Nyunt, suggests that she was a Tuesday born. If so, she would have been born on 28 December 1813, 4 January 1814, 11 January 1814 or 18 January 1814.); Nyaung-kan, Monywa District, Konbaung Burma
- Died: 3 May 1872 (aged 58); Friday, 12th waning of Kason 1234 ME; Mandalay, Konbaung Burma
- Burial: Mandalay Palace
- Spouse: Mindon Min
- Issue: None
Regnal name
- Sirimahāratanamaṅgaladevī (သီရိမဟာရတနာမင်္ဂလာဒေဝီ)
- House: Konbaung
- Father: Tha Phyu
- Mother: Min Hla
- Religion: Theravada Buddhism

Khin The (Burmese: ခင်သဲ, c. January 1814 – 3 May 1872), commonly known by her regnal title Thiri Maha Yadana Mingala Dewi (Burmese: သီရိမဟာရတနာမင်္ဂလာဒေဝီ; Pali: Sirimahāratanamaṅgaladevī), was the Queen of the Northern Palace of King Mindon Min during the Konbaung dynasty. Among several queen consorts, Khin The was renowned for her delicate beauty, grace, tenderness and talented as a court poet. She was also the most favored queen and beloved wife of King Mindon.

== Life ==
Khine The was born as Me Nyunt to Count Tha Phyu and his first wife Min Tha in Nyaunggyan village, Monywa. She had an older sister, Kyaktalone Thakhin, who was married to the minister of cavalry. Tha Phyu's second wife gave birth to two half-sisters of Khin The, Limban Mibaya and Thetpan Mibaya, who later became minor queens of King Mindon.

During her father's tenure as governor of Kanaung and Myanaung under Bagyidaw, Khin The entered the palace and began serving as a lady-in-waiting to Nanmadaw Me Nu at the age of 13. Khin The was favored by Prince Mindon's mother for her talent as a court poet. In 1834, she became a royal concubine of Prince Mindon. Khin The accompanied Prince Mindon and Prince Kanaung when they fled to Shwebo in rebellion against King Pagan.

Before the end of the rebellion, Prince Mindon pledged to Khin The that if he ascended the throne, he would make her his chief queen. When Mindon did become king, it was challenging to fulfill this promise because Khin The lacked royal blood, which faced opposition from officials and the crown prince. Nevertheless, on March 26, 1853, she was crowned the Queen of the Northern Palace with the royal title Thiri Maha Yadana Mingala Dewi. It's worth noting that in King Mindon's life, two desires remained unfulfilled: the appointment of his teacher U Sandima as the Thathanabaing of Burma (the head of the Buddhist Sangha), and the ability to make Khin The chief queen.

King Mindon felt great pity for breaking his promise to Khin The and once said,

(In Burmese): "နန်းမတော်မှာလည်း သားရတနာမထွန်းကား၊ အခုများ မယ်သဲမှာသာ သားယောကျာ်းတစ်ဦးဦးထွန်းကားလာခဲ့ရင် နန်းလောင်းရာထား မြှောက်စားတော်မူနိုင်ငဲ့"

(Translation): "Nanmadaw (the Queen) did not have a son, but now if Me The were to bear a son, he would be the heir apparent."

— King Mondon

She did not bear any issue but she adopted Salin Supaya, daughter of her half-sister Limban Mibaya, and Kwutywa Princess, daughter of Tamabin Mibaya. King Mindin made his adoptive daughter Salin Supaya the crown princess. She died on 3 May 1872 with the flu and was buried in the Mandalay Palace stockade but it no longer exists today. According to records, during the reign of King Thibaw, Queen Supayalat ordered the relocation of Khin The's tomb to a local cemetery, claiming that she did not belong to the royal bloodline. This event was documented in the book "Mandalay and Other Cities of the Past in Burma" by Vincent Clarence Scott O'Connor.

== See also ==
- Konbaung dynasty
- List of Burmese consorts
