= Zabwedaung Mibaya =

Zabwedaung Mibaya Mallādevī

Queen of fourth rank
- Born: Shin Hlaing; Unknown
- Died: 17 October 1857; 1st waxing of Tazaungmon 1219 ME; Mandalay
- Burial: Mandalay Palace
- Spouse: Mindon Min
- Issue: 1 son and 3 daughters, including: Princess of Pin; Princess of Momeik
Regnal name
- Mallādevī (မလ္လာဒေဝီ)
- House: Konbaung
- Religion: Theravada Buddhism

Zabwedaung Mibaya (Burmese: စားပွဲတောင်မိဖုရား), born Shin Hlaing and known by her royal titles, Thiri Mingala Yuza Mahe (Burmese: သီရိမင်္ဂလာရုဇာမဟေ; Pali: Sirimaṅgalarujāmahe) and Maladewi (Burmese: မလ္လာဒေဝီ; Pali: Mallādevī), was a queen of fourth rank of King Mindon Min during the Konbaung dynasty. She was later promoted to Devi-level queen.

Zabwedaung Mibaya was the sister of Lamaing Wun, minister of Lamaing. She had three daughters and a son, but only two daughters survived. She died on 17 October 1857.

== See also ==
- Konbaung dynasty
- List of Burmese royal consorts

== Bibliography ==
- Collection of Thet-Kayit: Money Lending Contracts of Myanmar Rural Area in Kon-baung Period. Vol. 1. Aichi University. 1999.
- Than Swe (Dawei), Maung (1999). ကုန်းဘောင် ရှင်းတမ်း [Expositions on Konbaung Period Topics] (in Burmese). Yangon: Ya-Pyae. pp. 149–151.
