= Salin Supaya =

Chief queen designate of Burma

Salin Supaya စလင်းစုဖုရား
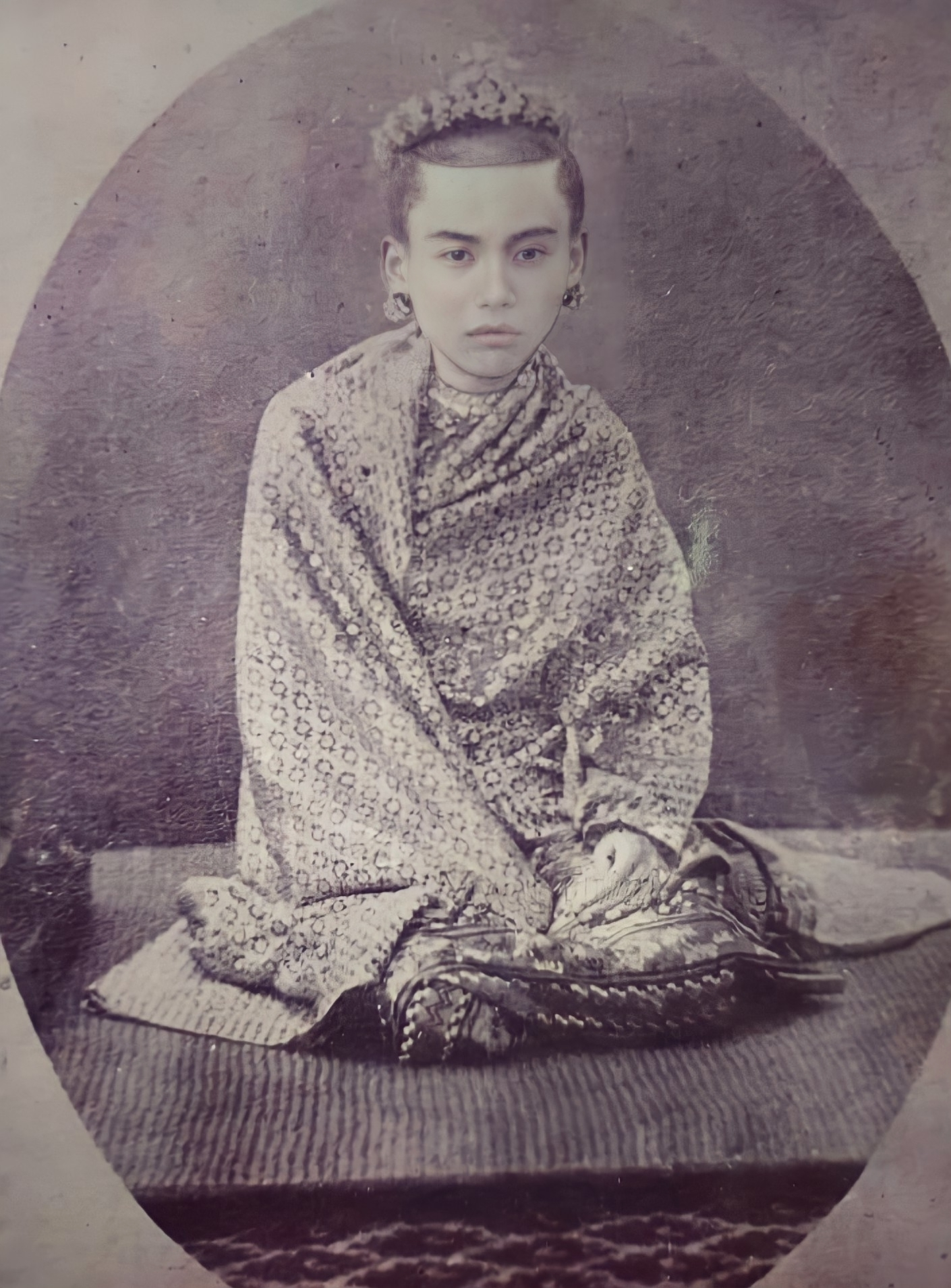
- Salin Supaya, c. 1866

Chief queen designate of Burma
- Reign: 1866 – 1878
- Predecessor: Setkya Dewi
- King: Mindon Min

Princess of Shwegu and Salin
- Reign: Circa 1853 – 1878
- Regent: Mindon Min
- Born: Me Myo Mon; 1847; Amarapura Palace
- Died: 1879 (aged 31–32); Salin Monastery, Mandalay
Regnal name
- Thu Thiri Myatswa Ratana Devi
- House: Konbaung
- Father: Mindon Min
- Mother: Limban Mibaya
- Religion: Theravada Buddhism

Thu Thiri Myatswa Ratana Devi (Burmese: သုသီရိမြတ်စွာရတနာဒေဝီ, Pali: Susīrimratswāratanādevi), commonly known as the Princess of Salin (Burmese: စလင်းမင်းသမီး) or Salin Supaya (Burmese: စလင်းစုဖုရား, pronounced [səlɪ́ɰ̃ sṵpʰəjá]), (Note: Burmese royals were only known by the name of the towns or territories they governed as liege-lord or myosa, which was the equivalent of a duke. For example, King Thibaw governed the town of Thibaw (Hsipaw, in the Shan State) when he was a prince.) was the Tabindaing princess (chief queen designate) during the late Konbaung dynasty in Burma. She was nicknamed "Selina Sophia" by Europeans. As a favourite daughter of King Mindon and one who was proficient in mathematics, she served as head of the royal treasury (the equivalent of HM Treasury) during the reign of King Mindon.

== Biography ==
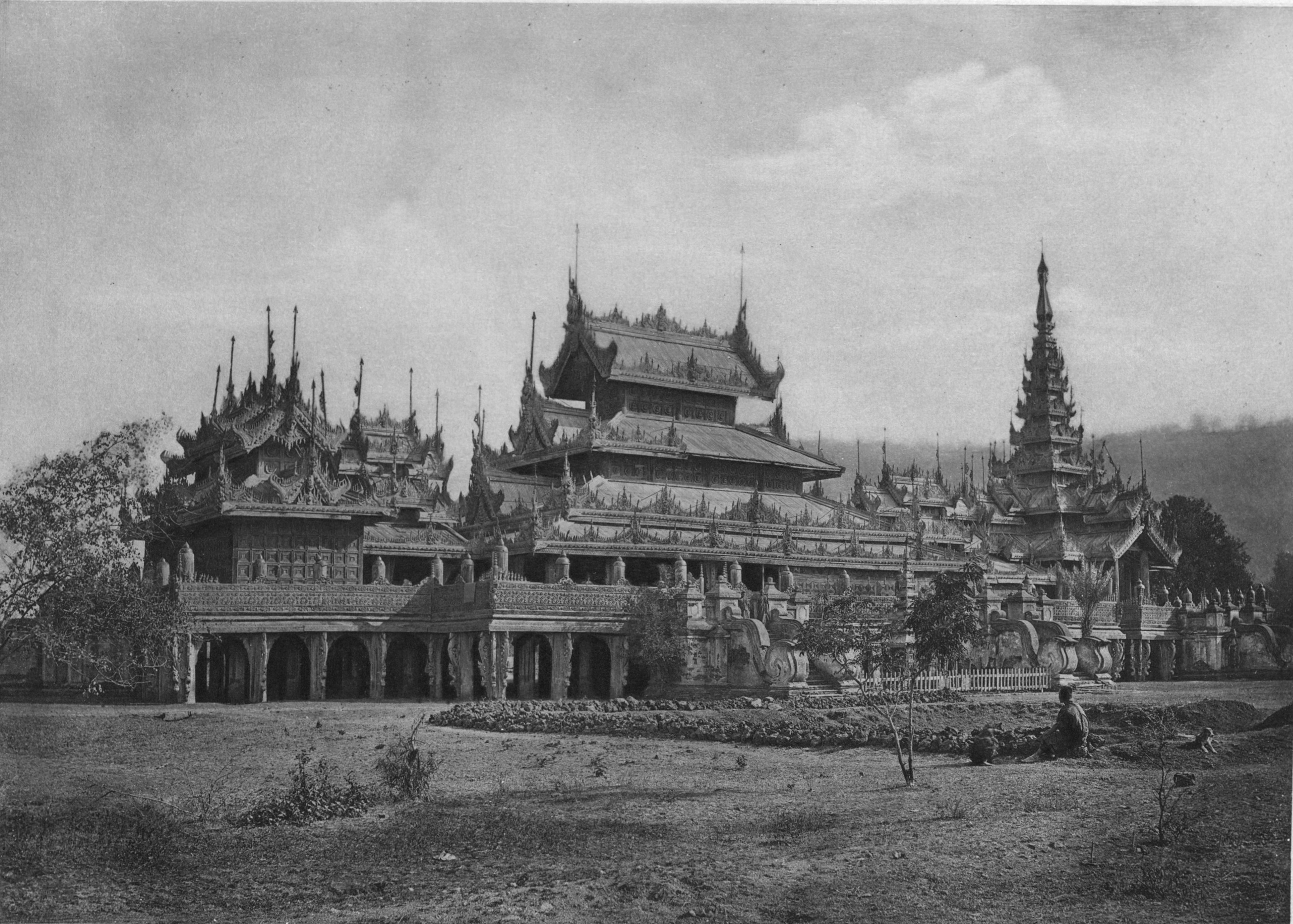
Salin Monastery

Salin Supaya was born in 1847 to King Mindon and his consort Limban Mibaya at the Amarapura Palace in the old capital of Amarapura in Burma. Her given name was Me Myo Mon (မယ်မျိုးမွန်). She was considered to be King Mindon's mother reborn. She was adopted by the Queen of the Northern Palace, Khin The, who was the half-sister of Limban Mibaya. When King Mindon ascended to the throne, Salin Supaya was granted the appanage of Shwegu and later of Salin, gaining the title Sri Ratana Devi. She also held the high-ranking royal title Supaya.

She was chosen as the Tabindaing Princess, or as the Einshe Hteik Hta Mibaya (Queen of the Crown Prince, အိမ်ရှေ့ထိပ်ထား မိဖုရား), after the assassination of Crown Prince Kanaung in 1866. The position of Chief Queen Designate or Tabindaing Princess is similar to the position of crown princess. The person designated is sequestered in a separate palace and expected to be the chief queen when the heir apparent eventually ascends the throne. As the saying goes, "Son Kyapin, daughter Salin," and since Salin Supaya was the dearest daughter of King Mindon, she was chosen by him for the position.

Although she was the chief queen designate, Salin Supaya took delight in religious works; most notable was her donation of Salin Monastery at Mandalay. In the end, however, Salin Supaya did not become Chief Queen as King Thibaw married Supayalat and her elder sister Supayagyi.

It is said that Salin Supaya joined the Buddhist order of nuns at Salin Monastery as soon as her father King Mindon was entombed. There she died in 1879 at the age of 33.

== In popular culture ==
- Thong Paya, one of the characters in Thai television series, Plerng Phra Nang is based on the historical prototype of Salin Supaya and that character is also portrayed as a chief-queen designate just as the same way as she was in the real history.
