= Ngahtatgyi Buddha Temple =

Buddhist temple in Bahan Township, Yangon

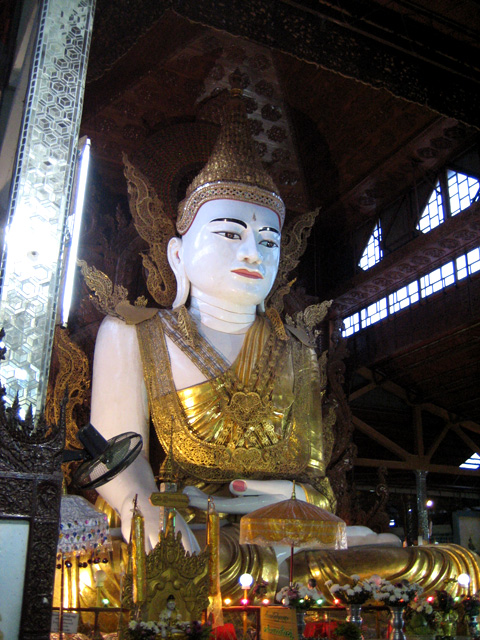

- Location within Myanmar

Religion
- Affiliation: Theravada Buddhism

Location
- Location: Bahan Township, Yangon
- Country: Myanmar
- Coordinates: 16.808389°N 96.162613°E

Architecture
- Founder: Prince Minyedeippa
- Completed: 1558; 468 years ago

Ngahtatgyi Buddha Temple (Burmese: ငါးထပ်ကြီးဘုရားကြီး) is a Buddhist temple in Bahan Township, Yangon, Burma, located off Shwegondine Road. A distinct five-tiered pagoda houses the original 20.5-foot (6.2 m) high Buddha image was donated by Prince Minyedeippa in 1558. A Buddha statue, 45.5 feet (13.9 m) on a pedestal, 30 feet (9.1 m) high and 46 feet (14 m) wide was erected at the temple in 1900.
