= Princess Taingda =

Thu Thiri Sanda Wadi
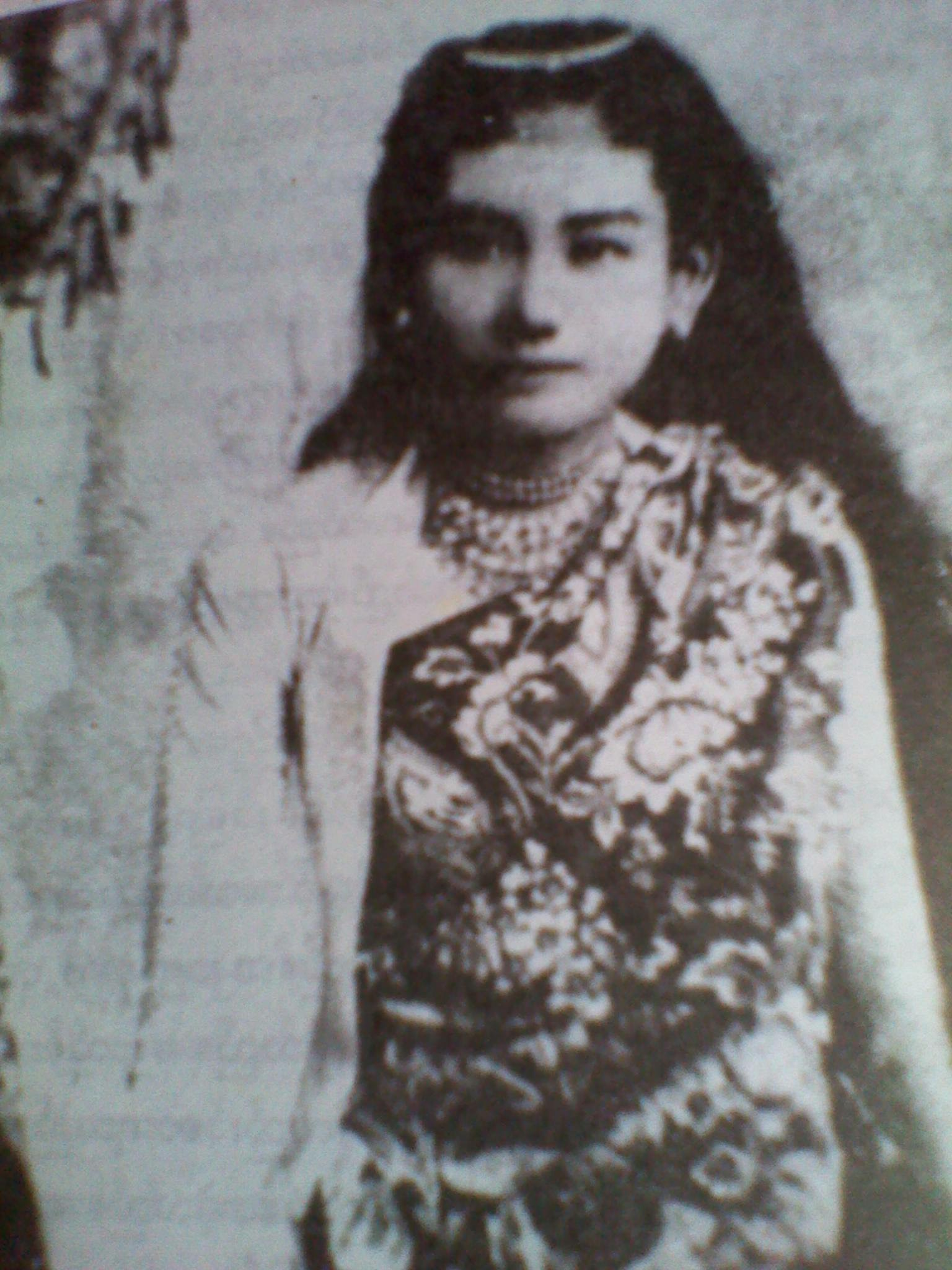

Princess of Taingda
- Reign: Circa 1870 – 1875
- Predecessor: Hteiktin Kodaw Thant
- Successor: Taingda Mingyi (as Lord of Taingda)

Princess of Natmauk
- Reign: 1875 – ?

Princess of Myothit
- Reign: ? – 1885
- Successor: Position disestablished
- Born: 1865; Mandalay
- Died: 1952 (aged 86–87); Rangoon, British Burma
- Burial: Mandalay Palace
- Husband: Prince of Kawlin
Regnal name
- Susīricandāvatī
- House: Konbaung
- Father: Mindon Min
- Mother: Tharazein Mibaya

Thu Thiri Sanda Wadi (Burmese: သုသီရိစန္ဒာဝတီ; Pali: Susīricandāvatī), commonly known as the Princess of Taingda (Note: Burmese royals were only known by the names of the towns or territories they governed as liege-lord or myosa, which is equivalent to a duke. For example, King Thibaw governed the town of Thibaw (Hsipaw, in the Shan State) when he was a prince.) (Burmese: တိုင်တားမင်းသမီး), was a Burmese royal princess during the Konbaung dynasty. She was also known as a royal goldsmith, renowned for her expertise in working with gems and precious metals; she made jewelry for the royal family.

== Biography ==
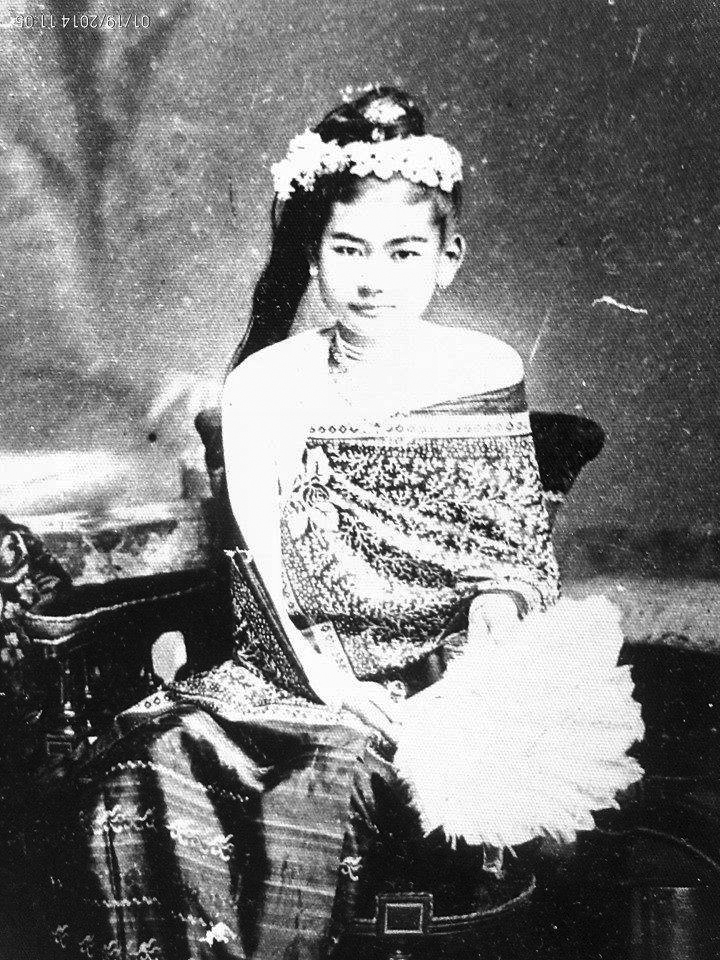
Princess of Taingda

Taingda Princess was born in 1865 at the Mandalay Palace, the daughter of Mindon Min by his consort, Tharazein Mibaya. She was one of the most beautiful daughters of King Mindon. She was granted the appanage of Taingda (a town between Sidoktaya and Minbu) and was therefore known as Taingda Hteik Khaung Tin. She also received the appanages of Myothit and, in 1875, Natmauk.

At the Rajabiseka Muddha Consecration of King Thibaw and Queen Supayalat, she was given the honor of making five speeches (Note: Her position at that time was comparable to that of George Bellew, the Garter Principal King of Arms at the coronation of Queen Elizabeth II.) and beating the great royal silver gong. She was specially favoured by Chief Queen Supayalat during the reign of King Thibaw, being awarded three golden bowls of jewellery.

After the fall of the Konbaung dynasty in 1885, the princess left the Mandalay Palace. She wed her half-brother, the Prince of Kawlin (1868 - 1923), on 20 February 1902. She died in 1952 in Rangoon.
