= Hsinbyumashin =

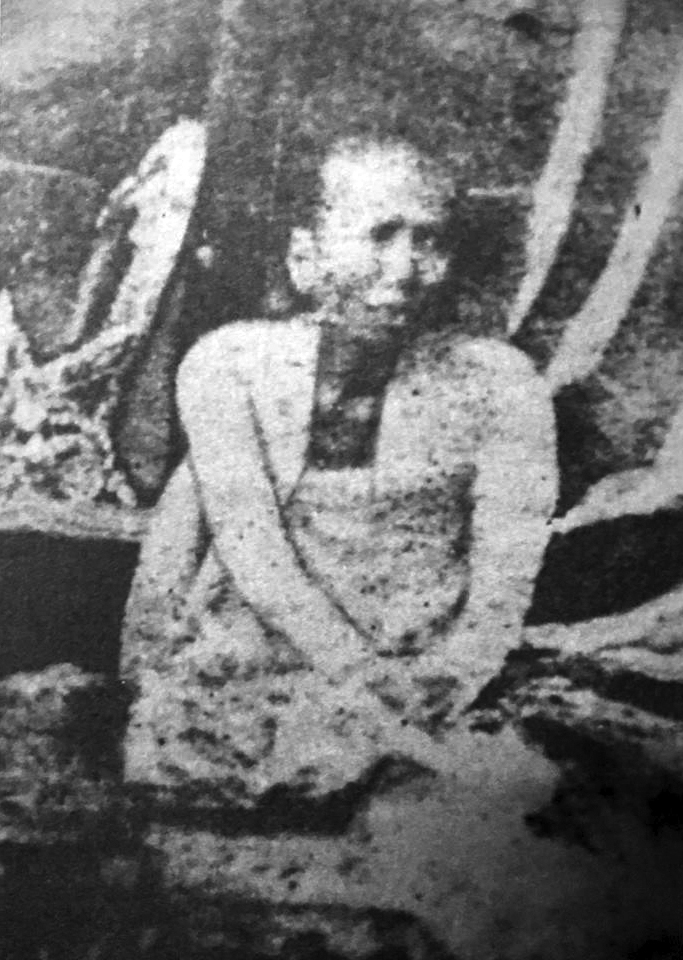
- Hsinbyumashin in her old age

Queen dowager of Burma
- Tenure: 1 October 1878 – 26 February 1900
- Predecessor: Me Myat Shwe, Queen of Kyapin
- Successor: Queen Supayalat

Queen of the Central Palace
- Tenure: 26 March 1853 – 1 October 1878
- Coronation: 1855
- Predecessor: Thiri Ti Lawka Atula Yadana Dewi; Thiri Thu Yadana Mingala Dewi
- Successor: None
- Born: Shwe Nanshin Me; 22 November 1821; Amarapura
- Died: 26 February 1900 (aged 78); Rangoon, British Burma
- Burial: Mandalay Palace
- Spouse: King Mindon Min
- Issue: Supayagyi; Supayalat; Supayalay
Regnal name
- Sīripavaratiloka Mahārājindādhipati Padumaratanādevī (သီရိပဝရတိလောက မဟာရာဇိန္ဒာဓိပတိ ပဒုမရတနာဒေဝီ)
- House: Konbaung
- Father: Bagyidaw (Sagaing Min)
- Mother: Nanmadaw Me Nu
- Religion: Theravada Buddhism

Hsinbyumashin (Burmese: ဆင်ဖြူမရှင်; 22 November 1821 – 26 February 1900) was a senior queen of King Mindon Min of Burma during the Konbaung dynasty. She was known for the Bronze Hall Massacre. She was the daughter of King Bagyidaw and his consort Nanmadaw Me Nu (Chief Queen of King Bagyidaw). She was one of the most influential queen consorts in Burmese history, and often regarded as the power behind the throne.

== Early life ==
Hsinbyumashin was born as Shwe Nanshin Me on 22 November 1821 to King Bagyidaw by his chief queen Nanmadaw Me Nu. She was granted the appanages of Sagaing and Singu after her birth. When her mother Me Nu was executed with attempts to seize the throne by King Tharrawaddy, Princess Setkya Dewi saved her life and took her home.

Later, she was wedded to Mindon Min, the penultimate king, who made her the high-ranking "Queen of the Central Palace" (အလယ်နန်းမတော်မိဖုရားကြီး). Her full regnal title upon ascending the throne was Sīripavaratiloka Mahārājindādhipati Padumaratanādevī (သီရိပဝရတိလောက မဟာရာဇိန္ဒာဓိပတိ ပဒုမရတနာဒေဝီ). On 25 November 1877, she received the title Hsinbyumashin, which translates to "mistress of the white elephants", upon receiving a white elephant named Sīrimahāsubhatta from King Mindon. King Mindon and Hsinbyumashin had seven children, but they did not survive– only Supayagyi, Supayalat and Supayalay were alive.

== Rise to power ==
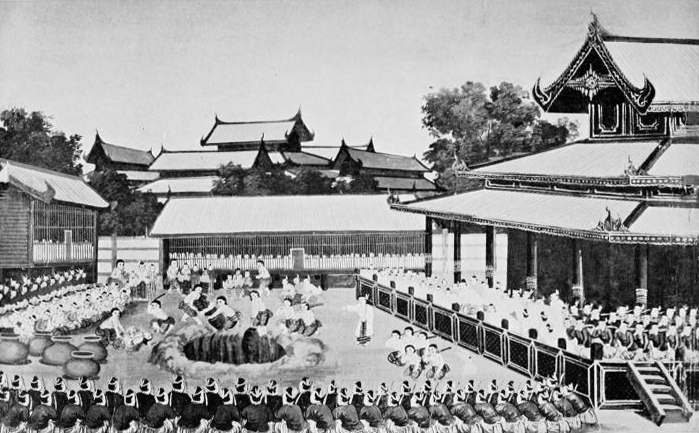
A painting depicting the massacre at Mandalay Palace

After the death of the chief queen, Setkya Dewi, Hsinbyumashin was the most eligible candidate to replace the chief queen position. However, King Mindon chose not to replace anyone, leaving the position vacant. Nevertheless, she received the rights of the chief queen in the palace and bestowed with the special royal title "Great Union Partner Queen" (မြတ်သောပြည်ထောင်ဖက်မိဖုရားကြီး).

Hsinbyumashin dominated significant influence during the final days of King Mindon's reign. Following King Mindon's death, she became a kingmaker and orchestrated a massacre that claimed the lives of more than 100 members of the royal family, including nearly all potential heirs to the throne. After this brutal event, she chose to install Prince Thibaw on the throne as her puppet and offered her eldest daughter, Supayagyi, to be his queen. During the royal Aggamahesi coronation, Supayalat pushed in next to her sister to be anointed queen at the same time, breaking an ancient royal custom. This resulted in two queens being anointed in parallel, a situation that had never occurred before in the history of Burma. After Thibaw ascended the throne, she was regarded as the queen dowager and granted the appanages of several territories including Amyint Prefecture, Salin, Talok, Bhamo and Wuntho. However, Supayalat later opposed her and successfully removed her influence over King Thibaw. This led to Hsinbyumashin's anger, and she secretly plotted to dethrone King Thibaw and replace Prince Nyaungyan on the throne, with the intention of arranging a marriage between him and her astute daughter, Supayagyi. However, Prince Nyaungyan died after falling ill. In the absence of Prince Nyaungyan, she planned to throne his younger brother, Prince Nyaungok. Hsinbyumashin sent a representative with a letter to Prince Nyaungok, who was residing in Calcutta. However, the letter did not reach Prince Nyaungok but ended up in the hands of Colonel Edward Bosc Sladen. Sladen's knowledge of the Burmese court politics, as revealed through the Queen's letter, presented a valuable opportunity for the British. Therefore, during the Third Anglo-Burmese War, the British disguised Maung Ba Than, the son of Rangoon Governor U Ohn, as Prince Nyangok and transported him on board a British ship along with several British troops to conquer Mandalay.

After Crown Prince Kanaung's assassination in 1866, King Mindon faced intense pressure to resolve the succession deadlock. It was widely believed that Mekkhaya Prince would be chosen to fill the succession vacuum. So Hsinbyumashin arranged for a matchmaker to approach the second Queen of the Northern Apartment, Nanda Dewi, to propose a marriage between Nanda Dewi's son, Mekkhaya Prince, and her eldest daughter, Supayagyi.

However, during this period, Kenni Princess, elder sister of Mekkhaya Prince, strongly disagreed with the proposed union. She insulted Supayagyi by saying,

(In Burmese): "သူ့သမီး နှာတန်မနဲ့ ငါ့မောင် တူသလား တန်သလား"

(Translation): "Like her daughter, 'long nose', really deserves my brother?."

— Kenni Princess

News of this incident quickly spread throughout the royal court, causing immense embarrassment to Hsinbyumashin. Due to this embarrassment, the queen harbored resentment toward Kenni Princess and her family. As Hsinbyumashin's power in the court grew, she ordered the arrest of Kenni Princess and her family during the Bronze Hall massacre. Shortly after their arrest, Kenni Princess, her mother, her brother Mekkhaya Prince, and the entire family were executed.

== Exile ==
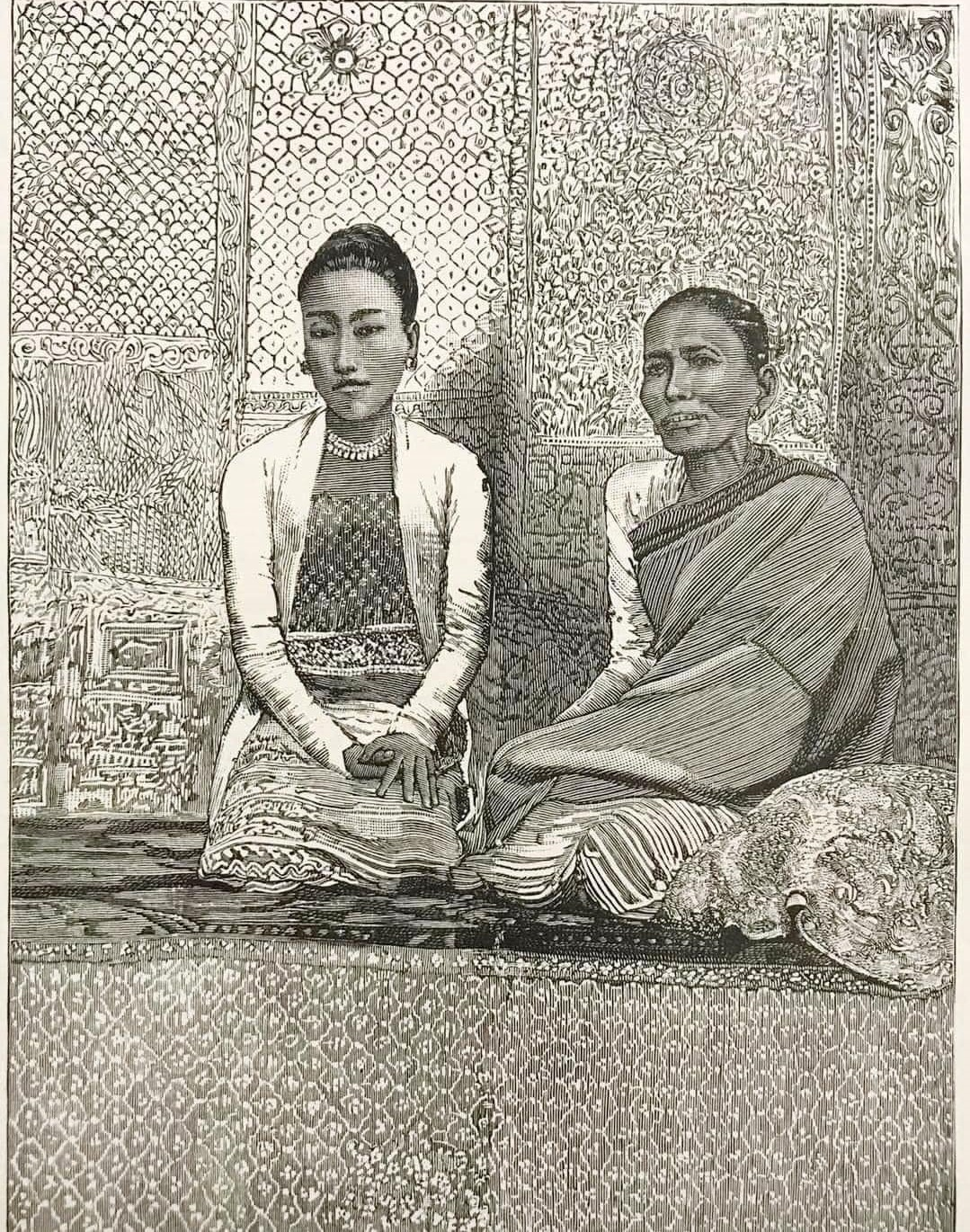
Supayagyi and Hsinbyumashin in Rangoon

The Konbaung dynasty reign lasted just seven years when Thibaw Min was defeated in the Third Anglo-Burmese War and forced to abdicate by the British in 1885. On 25 November 1885, the royal family were taken away in a covered carriage, leaving Mandalay Palace by the southern gate of the walled city along the streets lined by British soldiers and their wailing subjects, to the River Irrawaddy where a steamboat called Thuriya (Sun) awaited. Hsinbyumashin and her daughter, Supayagyi, were sent to Tavoy (now Dawei). Hsinbyumashin and her daughter Supayagyi were designated by the British government as recipients of the first-grade political pensions. During that period, the pension for first-grade royalty was set at 150 kyats, the second grade at 100 kyats, and the third grade at 50 kyats, respectively. Initially, she received only 150 kyats as a first-grade pension. However, with special permission granted on January 17, 1886, Hsinbyumashin's pension was increased to 300 kyats. In 1893, her pension was further raised, initially to 365 kyats, and eventually to 450 kyats.

Meanwhile, in 1887, a rebellion against British rule erupted in Tavoy. The British feared that the Queen would be encouraged by this rebellion. Consequently, along with his daughter Supayagyi and Kawlin Prince, she was sent to Rangoon and then Calcutta by sea. On June 10, 1887, the group arrived in Calcutta. The Queen expressed her desire to live in Calcutta, but the Governor-General informed her that she would be accommodated in a private mansion upon her arrival in Ratnagiri. Due to health issues, she stayed in Calcutta for approximately two months before taking a train to Bombay and finally arriving at King Thibaw's mansion in Ratnagiri on 22 August 1887. After residing in Ratnagiri for approximately a year, the Queen returned to Rangoon and purchased a house on Winsa Road (now Shin Sawbu Road), located near the Government House, Rangoon.

== Final days and death ==
During her stay in Rangoon, some minor queens and children of the deceased King Mindon came to pay their respects to Hsinbyumashin. However, some, including Limban Mibaya (whose son she executed in the massacre at Mandalay Palace) and Naungmon Princess, refused to do so. She spent her final days leading the funeral ceremonies for members of the royal family. In 1893, her adversary Limban Mibaya died, and she donated 11 kāṣāyas for the concept of merit. After returning from the funeral of Thetpan Mibaya, she fell ill and died on 26 February 1900 in Rangoon, British Burma.

The British government granted 1,000 kyats for the Queen's funeral expenses. With the permission of the British government, the body was transported to Mandalay via a sea voyage through Rangoon. During the journey, the ship made stops in towns and villages, where people made offerings to pay their respects to the queen's body. Upon arrival in Mandalay, the Queen's body was not immediately buried. Instead, it was laid out in Nyang Shwe Sawba’s courtyard (presently located between 75-76 Streets, near Kyaw Moe Gate, south of Mandalay) for a duration of approximately one month. In preparation for the final entombment, her body was carried to the palace through the southern middle gate of the palace. Her remains were interred at the Mandalay Palace enclosure (see Konbaung tombs).

== In popular culture ==
- Portrayed by Chamaiporn Jaturaput in Plerng Phra Nang, a 1996 Thai soap opera loosely based on Hsinbyumashin's life
- Portrayed by San Shar Tin in the 1997 Burmese film Never Shall We Be Enslaved
- Portrayed by Patcharapa Chaichua in Plerng Phra Nang, a 2017 version
- The life of Queen Hsinbyumashin and her role in the Massacre of the Mandalay Palace were dramatized in The White Elephant (ဆင်ဖြူတော်), a 2025 animated short film directed by Thet Chal for CalArts.
- Portrayed by Pimchanok Luevisadpaibul in Plerng Phra Nang, a 2026 version on Netflix

== See also ==
- Konbaung dynasty
- Supayalat
- Mindon Min

Hsinbyumashin Konbaung Dynasty
Royal titles
Preceded by Thiri Ti Lawka Atula Yadana Dewi; Thiri Thu Yadana Mingala Dewi	Queen of the Central Palace of Burma; 26 July 1855 - 1 October 1878	-
