= May 14 =

May 14 this year in various calendars
- Thursday, 14 May 2026
Akan	Kuruyaw
Armenian	28 Mareri 1475
Aztec	Ochpaniztli 4, 8 Malīnalli
Babylonian	26 Nisanu, 2337 SE
Balinese pawukon	Luang, Pepet, Pasah, Menala, Umanis, Paniron, Wraspati of Gumbreg, Uma, Dangu, Duka
Bengali	31 Boisakh, BS 1433
Chinese	Yang Earth Rat・Legs Mansion; Fire Horse Year, Month 3, Day 28 (Lixia, 7 days until Xiaoman)
Common Era	14 May 2026 CE
Coptic	6 Pashons, AM 1742
Egyptian	28 Thoth, 2775 NE
Ethiopian	6 Genbot, 2018 Amätä Məhrät
French Republican	Décade III, Quintidi de Floréal de l'Année 234 de la République
Gregorian	14 May, AD 2026
Hebrew	27 Iyar, AM 5786; Omer 42
Hindu	Revatī・Prīti; Solar: 31 Vaiśākha, 1948 SE; Lunisolar: Dvādaśī, Kṛishna pakṣa of Vaiśākha, 2083 VE; Rāudra・5127 KY・1,872,709
Icelandic	Fimmtudagur, 22 Harpa 2026
Islamic	27 Dhu al-Qi'dah, AH 1447 (using tabular method)
ISO week date	2026-W20-4
Japanese	28 Yayoi, Reiwa 8 (Rikka, 7 days until Shōman)
Julian	1 May, AD 2026 (AM 7534)
Julian day	2461175
Korean	28 Yongdal, 4359 DE
Maya	13.0.13.10.12; 5 Zip, 8 Eb
Roman	Kalendis Maiis, MMDCCLXXIX AUC
Solar Hijri	24 Ordibehesht, SH 1405
Tibetan	27 nag pa, me pho rta 2153 or 1772 or 1000

<<	May					>>
Su	Mo	Tu	We	Th	Fr	Sa
					1	2
3	4	5	6	7	8	9
10	11	12	13	14	15	16
17	18	19	20	21	22	23
24	25	26	27	28	29	30
31
2026

May 14 in recent years
2026 (Thursday)
2025 (Wednesday)
2024 (Tuesday)
2023 (Sunday)
2022 (Saturday)
2021 (Friday)
2020 (Thursday)
2019 (Tuesday)
2018 (Monday)
2017 (Sunday)

May 14 is the 134th day of the year (135th in leap years) in the Gregorian calendar; 231 days remain until the end of the year.

== Events ==
=== Pre-1600 ===
- 1027 – Robert II of France names his son Henry I as junior King of the Franks.
- 1097 – The Siege of Nicaea begins during the First Crusade.
- 1264 – Battle of Lewes: Henry III of England is captured and forced to sign the Mise of Lewes, making Simon de Montfort the effective ruler of England.
- 1450 – A large Ottoman force begins the siege of Albanian rebel forces in Krujë, that ultimately will fail.
- 1465 – During the 1465 Moroccan revolution which overthrows the Marinid dynasty, the Jewish mellah is attacked by the population of Fez, though the extent of the massacre is debated.
- 1509 – Battle of Agnadello: In northern Italy, French forces defeat the Republic of Venice.

=== 1601–1900 ===
- 1607 – English colonists establish "James Fort", which would become Jamestown, Virginia, the earliest permanent English settlement in the Americas.
- 1608 – The Protestant Union, a coalition of Protestant German states, is founded to defend the rights, land and safety of each member against the Catholic Church and Catholic German states.
- 1610 – Henry IV of France is assassinated by Catholic zealot François Ravaillac, and Louis XIII ascends the throne.
- 1747 – War of the Austrian Succession: A British fleet under Admiral George Anson defeats the French at the First Battle of Cape Finisterre.
- 1796 – Edward Jenner administers the first smallpox inoculation.
- 1800 – The 6th United States Congress recesses, and the process of moving the Federal government of the United States from Philadelphia to Washington, D.C., begins the following day.
- 1804 – William Clark and 42 men depart from Camp Dubois to join Meriwether Lewis at St Charles, Missouri, marking the beginning of the Lewis and Clark Expedition's historic journey up the Missouri River.
- 1811 – Paraguay: Pedro Juan Caballero, Fulgencio Yegros and José Gaspar Rodríguez de Francia start actions to depose the Spanish governor.
- 1832 – The Battle of Stillman's Run, the first battle of the Black Hawk War, is fought.
- 1836 – The Treaties of Velasco are signed in Velasco, Texas.
- 1842 – The first edition of The Illustrated London News, the world's first illustrated weekly news magazine, is published.
- 1857 – Mindon Min is crowned as King of Burma in Mandalay, Burma.
- 1863 – American Civil War: During the Vicksburg campaign, Union forces drive Confederates under Joseph E. Johnston out of Jackson, Mississippi in the Battle of Jackson.
- 1868 – Boshin War: The Battle of Utsunomiya Castle ends as former Tokugawa shogunate forces withdraw northward.
- 1870 – The first game of rugby in New Zealand is played in Nelson between Nelson College and the Nelson Rugby Football Club.
- 1878 – The last witchcraft trial held in the United States begins in Salem, Massachusetts, after Lucretia Brown, an adherent of Christian Science, accused Daniel Spofford of attempting to harm her through his mental powers.
- 1879 – The first group of 463 Indian indentured laborers arrives in Fiji aboard the Leonidas.

=== 1901–present ===
- 1900 – Opening of World Amateur championship at the Paris Exposition Universelle, also known as Olympic Games.
- 1913 – Governor of New York William Sulzer approves the charter for the Rockefeller Foundation, which begins operations with a $100 million donation from John D. Rockefeller.
- 1915 – The May 14 Revolt takes place in Lisbon, Portugal.
- 1918 – Cape Town Mayor, Sir Harry Hands, inaugurates the two-minute silence.
- 1925 – Mrs Dalloway, one of Virginia Woolf's earliest and best-known novels, is published.
- 1931 – Five unarmed civilians are killed in the Ådalen shootings, as the Swedish military is called in to deal with protesting workers.
- 1935 – The Constitution of the Philippines is ratified by a popular vote.
- 1939 – Lina Medina becomes the youngest confirmed mother in medical history at the age of five.
- 1940 – World War II: Rotterdam, Netherlands, is bombed by the Luftwaffe of Nazi Germany despite a ceasefire, killing about 900 people and destroying the historic city center.
- 1943 – World War II: A Japanese submarine sinks AHS Centaur off the coast of Queensland.
- 1948 – Israel is declared to be an independent state and a provisional government is established. Immediately after the declaration, Israel is attacked by the neighboring Arab states, triggering the 1948 Arab–Israeli War.
- 1951 – Trains run on the Talyllyn Railway in Wales for the first time since preservation, making it the first railway in the world to be operated by volunteers.
- 1953 – Approximately 7,100 brewery workers in Milwaukee perform a walkout, marking the start of the 1953 Milwaukee brewery strike.
- 1955 – Cold War: Eight Communist bloc countries, including the Soviet Union, sign a mutual defense treaty called the Warsaw Pact.
- 1961 – Civil rights movement: A white mob twice attacks a Freedom Riders bus near Anniston, Alabama, before fire-bombing the bus and attacking the civil rights protesters who flee the burning vehicle.
- 1970 – Andreas Baader is freed from custody by Ulrike Meinhof, Gudrun Ensslin and others, a pivotal moment in the formation of the Red Army Faction.
- 1973 – Skylab, the United States' first space station, is launched.
- 1977 – A Dan-Air Boeing 707 leased to IAS Cargo Airlines crashes on approach to Lusaka International Airport in Lusaka, Zambia, killing six people.
- 1980 – Salvadoran Civil War: The Sumpul River massacre occurs in Chalatenango, El Salvador.
- 1987 – Fijian Prime Minister Timoci Bavadra is ousted from power in a coup d'état led by Lieutenant colonel Sitiveni Rabuka.
- 1988 – Carrollton bus collision: A drunk driver traveling the wrong way on Interstate 71 near Carrollton, Kentucky, hits a converted school bus carrying a church youth group. Twenty-seven die in the crash and ensuing fire.
- 2004 – The Constitutional Court of South Korea overturns the impeachment of President Roh Moo-hyun.
- 2004 – Crown Prince Frederik of Denmark and Mary Donaldson are married at Copenhagen Cathedral.
- 2004 – Rico Linhas Aéreas Flight 4815 crashes into the Amazon rainforest during approach to Eduardo Gomes International Airport in Manaus, Brazil, killing 33 people.
- 2008 – Battle of Piccadilly Gardens in Manchester city centre between Zenit supporters and Rangers supporters and the Greater Manchester Police; 39 policemen injured, one police dog injured and 39 arrested.
- 2010 – Space Shuttle Atlantis launches on the STS-132 mission to deliver the first shuttle-launched Russian ISS component — Rassvet. This was originally slated to be the final launch of Atlantis, before Congress approved STS-135.
- 2012 – Agni Air Flight CHT crashes in Nepal after a failed go-around, killing 15 people.
- 2021 – China successfully lands Zhurong, the country's first Mars rover.
- 2022 – Ten people are killed in a mass shooting in Buffalo, New York.

== Births ==
=== Pre-1600 ===
- 1316 – Charles IV, Holy Roman Emperor (died 1378)
- 1553 – Margaret of Valois, Queen of France (died 1615)
- 1574 – Francesco Rasi, Italian singer-songwriter, theorbo player, and poet (died 1621)
- 1592 – Alice Barnham, wife of statesman Francis Bacon (died 1650)

=== 1601–1900 ===
- 1630 – Katakura Kagenaga, Japanese samurai (died 1681)
- 1652 – Johann Philipp Förtsch, German composer (died 1732)
- 1657 – Chhatrapati Sambhaji Maharaj, Indian(Maratha) emperor (died 1689)
- 1666 – Victor Amadeus II of Sardinia (died 1732)
- 1679 – Peder Horrebow, Danish astronomer and mathematician (died 1764)
- 1699 – Hans Joachim von Zieten, Prussian general (died 1786)
- 1701 – William Emerson, English mathematician and academic (died 1782)
- 1710 – Adolf Frederick, King of Sweden (died 1771)
- 1725 – Ludovico Manin, the last Doge of Venice (died 1802)
- 1727 – Thomas Gainsborough, English painter (died 1788)
- 1737 – George Macartney, 1st Earl Macartney, Irish-English politician and diplomat, Governor of Grenada (died 1806)
- 1752 – Timothy Dwight IV, American minister, theologian, and academic (died 1817)
- 1752 – Albrecht Thaer, German agronomist and author (died 1828)
- 1761 – Samuel Dexter, American lawyer and politician, 4th United States Secretary of War, 3rd United States Secretary of the Treasury (died 1816)
- 1771 – Robert Owen, Welsh businessman and social reformer (died 1858)
- 1771 – Thomas Wedgwood, English photographer (died 1805)
- 1781 – Friedrich Ludwig Georg von Raumer, German historian and academic (died 1873)
- 1794 – Fanny Imlay, daughter of British feminist Mary Wollstonecraft (died 1816)
- 1814 – Charles Beyer, German-English engineer, co-founded Beyer, Peacock & Company (died 1876)
- 1817 – Alexander Kaufmann, German poet and educator (died 1893)
- 1820 – James Martin, Irish-Australian politician, 6th Premier of New South Wales (died 1886)
- 1830 – Antonio Annetto Caruana, Maltese archaeologist and author (died 1905)
- 1832 – Rudolf Lipschitz, German mathematician and academic (died 1903)
- 1851 – Anna Laurens Dawes, American author and anti-suffragist (died 1938)
- 1852 – Henri Julien, Canadian illustrator (died 1908)
- 1863 – John Charles Fields, Canadian mathematician, founder of the Fields Medal (died 1932)
- 1867 – Kurt Eisner, German journalist and politician, Prime Minister of Bavaria (died 1919)
- 1868 – Magnus Hirschfeld, German physician and sexologist (died 1935)
- 1869 – Arthur Rostron, English mariner, captain of the rescue ship Carpathia during the Titanic disaster (died 1940)
- 1872 – Elia Dalla Costa, Italian cardinal (died 1961)
- 1878 – J. L. Wilkinson, American baseball player and manager (died 1964)
- 1879 – Fred Englehardt, American jumper (died 1942)
- 1880 – Wilhelm List, German field marshal (died 1971)
- 1881 – Lionel Hill, Australian politician, 30th Premier of South Australia (died 1963)
- 1881 – George Murray Hulbert, American judge and politician (died 1950)
- 1885 – Otto Klemperer, German composer and conductor (died 1973)
- 1887 – Ants Kurvits, Estonian general and politician, 10th Estonian Minister of War (died 1943)
- 1888 – Archie Alexander, American mathematician and engineer (died 1958)
- 1893 – Louis Verneuil, French actor and playwright (died 1952)
- 1897 – Sidney Bechet, American saxophonist, clarinet player, and composer (died 1959)
- 1897 – Ed Ricketts, American biologist and ecologist (died 1948)
- 1899 – Charlotte Auerbach, German-Scottish folklorist, geneticist, and zoologist (died 1994)
- 1899 – Pierre Victor Auger, French physicist and academic (died 1993)
- 1899 – Earle Combs, American baseball player and coach (died 1976)
- 1900 – Hal Borland, American journalist and author (died 1978)
- 1900 – Walter Rehberg, Swiss pianist and composer (died 1957)
- 1900 – Cai Chang, Chinese first leader of All-China Women's Federation (died 1990)
- 1900 – Leo Smit, Dutch pianist and composer (died 1943)
- 1900 – Edgar Wind, German-English historian, author, and academic (died 1971)

=== 1901–present ===
- 1901 – Robert Ritter, German psychologist and physician (died 1951)
- 1903 – Billie Dove, American actress (died 1997)
- 1904 – Hans Albert Einstein, Swiss-American engineer and educator (died 1973)
- 1904 – Marcel Junod, Swiss physician and anesthesiologist (died 1961)
- 1905 – Jean Daniélou, French cardinal and theologian (died 1974)
- 1905 – Herbert Morrison, American journalist (died 1989)
- 1905 – Antonio Berni, Argentinian painter, illustrator, and engraver (died 1981)
- 1907 – Ayub Khan, Pakistani general and politician, 2nd President of Pakistan (died 1974)
- 1907 – Johnny Moss, gambler and professional poker player, first winner of the World Series of Poker (died 1995)
- 1910 – Ne Win, Burmese army general and politician, 4th President of Burma (died 2002)
- 1914 – Gul Khan Nasir, Pakistani journalist, poet, and politician (died 1983)
- 1914 – William Tutte, British codebreaker and mathematician (died 2002)
- 1916 – Robert F. Christy, Canadian-American physicist and astronomer (died 2012)
- 1916 – Marco Zanuso, Italian architect and designer (died 2001)
- 1917 – Lou Harrison, American composer and critic (died 2003)
- 1921 – Richard Deacon, American actor (died 1984)
- 1922 – Franjo Tuđman, Croatian historian and politician, 1st President of Croatia (died 1999)
- 1923 – Josette Molland, artist, French Resistance member, and Holocaust survivor (died 2019)
- 1923 – Adnan Pachachi, Iraqi politician, Iraqi Minister of Foreign Affairs (died 2019)
- 1923 – Mrinal Sen, Bangladeshi-Indian director, producer, and screenwriter (died 2018)
- 1925 – Sophie Kurys, American baseball player (died 2013)
- 1925 – Patrice Munsel, American soprano and actress (died 2016)
- 1925 – Oona O'Neill, British actress (died 1991)
- 1926 – Eric Morecambe, English comedian and actor (died 1984)
- 1927 – Herbert W. Franke, Austrian scientist and author (died 2022)
- 1928 – Frederik H. Kreuger, Dutch engineer, author, and academic (died 2015)
- 1929 – Barbara Branden, Canadian-American author (died 2013)
- 1929 – Henry McGee, English actor and singer (died 2006)
- 1929 – Gump Worsley, Canadian ice hockey player (died 2007)
- 1930 – William James, Australian general and physician (died 2015)
- 1931 – Alvin Lucier, American composer and academic (died 2021)
- 1933 – Siân Phillips, Welsh actress and singer
- 1935 – Ethel Johnson, American professional wrestler (died 2018)
- 1936 – Bobby Darin, American singer-songwriter and actor (died 1973)
- 1936 – Dick Howser, American baseball player, coach, and manager (died 1987)
- 1937 – Vic Flick, English guitarist (died 2024)
- 1940 – H. Jones, English colonel, Victoria Cross recipient (died 1982)
- 1942 – Byron Dorgan, American lawyer and politician
- 1942 – Alistair McAlpine, Baron McAlpine of West Green, English businessman and politician (died 2014)
- 1942 – Tony Pérez, Cuban-American baseball player and manager
- 1943 – Jack Bruce, Scottish-English singer-songwriter and bass player (died 2014)
- 1943 – Ólafur Ragnar Grímsson, Icelandic academic and politician, 5th President of Iceland
- 1943 – Eddie Low, New Zealand country singer and musician (died 2024)
- 1944 – Gene Cornish, Canadian-American guitarist
- 1944 – George Lucas, American director, producer, and screenwriter, founded Lucasfilm
- 1944 – David Kelly, Welsh scientist (died 2003)
- 1945 – Francesca Annis, English actress
- 1945 – Yochanan Vollach, Israeli footballer
- 1947 – Ana Martín, Mexican actress, singer, producer and former model (Miss Mexico 1963)
- 1947 – Jon Landau, American music critic and record producer
- 1948 – Bob Woolmer, Indian-English cricketer and coach (died 2007)
- 1949 – Jim Folsom Jr., American politician, 50th Governor of Alabama
- 1952 – David Byrne, Scottish-American singer-songwriter, producer, and actor
- 1952 – Michael Fallon, Scottish politician, Secretary of State for Defence
- 1952 – Donald R. McMonagle, American colonel, pilot, and astronaut
- 1952 – Robert Zemeckis, American director, producer, and screenwriter
- 1953 – Tom Cochrane, Canadian singer-songwriter and guitarist
- 1955 – Zofija Mazej Kukovič, Slovenian electrical engineer and minister of health 2007–8
- 1955 – Dennis Martínez, Nicaraguan baseball player and coach
- 1955 – Big Van Vader, American wrestler and football player (died 2018)
- 1956 – Hazel Blears, English lawyer and politician, Secretary of State for Communities and Local Government
- 1956 – Steve Hogarth, English singer-songwriter and keyboardist
- 1958 – Christine Brennan, American journalist and author
- 1958 – Rudy Pérez, Cuban-born American composer and music producer
- 1959 – Carlisle Best, Barbadian cricketer
- 1959 – Patrick Bruel, French actor, singer, and poker player
- 1959 – Robert Greene, American author and translator
- 1959 – Rick Vaive, Canadian ice hockey player and coach
- 1959 – Heather Wheeler, English politician
- 1960 – Anne Clark, English singer-songwriter and poet
- 1960 – Frank Nobilo, New Zealand golfer
- 1960 – Ronan Tynan, Irish tenor
- 1961 – Tim Roth, English actor and director
- 1961 – Alain Vigneault, Canadian ice hockey player and coach
- 1962 – Ian Astbury, English-Canadian singer-songwriter
- 1962 – C.C. DeVille, American guitarist, songwriter, and actor
- 1962 – Danny Huston, Italian-American actor and director
- 1963 – Pat Borders, American baseball player and coach
- 1964 – Suzy Kolber, American sportscaster and producer
- 1964 – Alan McIndoe, Australian rugby league player
- 1966 – Mike Inez, American rock bass player and songwriter
- 1966 – Fab Morvan, French singer-songwriter, dancer and model
- 1966 – Raphael Saadiq, American singer-songwriter, guitarist, and producer
- 1967 – Tony Siragusa, American football player and journalist (died 2022)
- 1968 – Greg Davies, Welsh actor, comedian, writer and presenter
- 1969 – Cate Blanchett, Australian actress
- 1969 – Sabine Schmitz, German race car driver and sportscaster (died 2021)
- 1970 – Peter Filandia, Australian footballer
- 1971 – Sofia Coppola, American director, producer, and screenwriter
- 1971 – Martin Reim, Estonian footballer and manager
- 1972 – Ike Moriz, German-South African singer-songwriter, producer and actor
- 1972 – Kirstjen Nielsen, American attorney, 6th United States Secretary of Homeland Security
- 1973 – Natalie Appleton, Canadian singer and actress
- 1973 – Fraser Nelson, Scottish journalist
- 1975 – Gulmurod Khalimov, Tajikistani police commander turned Islamic State mercenary outlaw
- 1975 – Nicki Sørensen, Danish cyclist
- 1976 – Hunter Burgan, American multi-instrumentalist and bassist of rock band AFI
- 1976 – Martine McCutcheon, English actress and singer
- 1977 – Roy Halladay, American baseball player (died 2017)
- 1977 – Ada Nicodemou, Australian actress
- 1978 – Brent Harvey, Australian footballer
- 1978 – Eddie House, American basketball player
- 1979 – Dan Auerbach, American singer-songwriter, guitarist, and producer
- 1979 – Clinton Morrison, Irish international footballer
- 1980 – Júlia Sebestyén, Hungarian figure skater
- 1981 – Pranav Mistry, Indian computer scientist, invented SixthSense
- 1983 – Anahí, Mexican singer-songwriter, producer, and actress
- 1983 – Frank Gore, American football player
- 1983 – Tatenda Taibu, Zimbabwean cricketer
- 1983 – Amber Tamblyn, American actress, author, model, director
- 1984 – Gary Ablett, Jr., Australian footballer
- 1984 – Olly Murs, English singer-songwriter
- 1984 – Mark Zuckerberg, American computer programmer and businessman, co-founder of Facebook
- 1985 – Dustin Lynch, American singer-songwriter
- 1985 – Sam Perrett, New Zealand rugby league player
- 1985 – Zack Ryder, American wrestler
- 1986 – Clay Matthews III, American football player
- 1987 – François Steyn, South African rugby player
- 1989 – Rob Gronkowski, American football player
- 1993 – Miranda Cosgrove, American actress and singer
- 1993 – Kyle Freeland, American baseball player
- 1993 – Kristina Mladenovic, French tennis player
- 1994 – Marquinhos, Brazilian footballer
- 1994 – Pernille Blume, Danish swimmer
- 1994 – Bronte Campbell, Malawian-Australian swimmer
- 1995 – Rose Lavelle, American soccer player
- 1996 – Blake Brockington, American trans man and activist (died 2015)
- 1996 – Martin Garrix, Dutch DJ
- 1996 – Pokimane, Moroccan-Canadian internet personality
- 1997 – Rúben Dias, Portuguese footballer
- 2001 – Jack Hughes, American hockey player
- 2002 – Zach Edey, Canadian basketball player

== Deaths ==
=== Pre-1600 ===
- 649 – Pope Theodore I
- 934 – Zhu Hongzhao, Chinese general and governor
- 964 – Pope John XII (born 927)
- 1080 – Walcher, Bishop of Durham
- 1219 – William Marshal, 1st Earl of Pembroke, English soldier and politician (born 1147)
- 1576 – Tahmasp I, Shah of Persia (born 1514)

=== 1601–1900 ===
- 1603 – Magnus II, Duke of Saxe-Lauenburg (born 1543)
- 1608 – Charles III, Duke of Lorraine (born 1543)
- 1610 – Henry IV of France (born 1553)
- 1643 – Louis XIII of France (born 1601)
- 1649 – Friedrich Spanheim, Swiss theologian and academic (born 1600)
- 1667 – Georges de Scudéry, French author, poet, and playwright (born 1601)
- 1688 – Antoine Furetière, French scholar, lexicographer, and author (born 1619)
- 1754 – Pierre-Claude Nivelle de La Chaussée, French playwright and producer (born 1692)
- 1761 – Thomas Simpson, English mathematician and academic (born 1710)
- 1847 – Fanny Hensel, German pianist and composer (born 1805)
- 1860 – Ludwig Bechstein, German author (born 1801)
- 1873 – Gideon Brecher, Austrian physician and author (born 1797)
- 1878 – Ōkubo Toshimichi, Japanese samurai and politician (born 1830)
- 1881 – Mary Seacole, Jamaican-English nurse and author (born 1805)
- 1889 – Volney Howard, American lawyer, jurist, and politician (born 1809)
- 1893 – Ernst Kummer, German mathematician and academic (born 1810)

=== 1901–present ===
- 1906 – Carl Schurz, German-American general, journalist, and politician, 13th United States Secretary of the Interior (born 1829)
- 1912 – Frederik VIII of Denmark (born 1843)
- 1912 – August Strindberg, Swedish playwright, novelist, poet, essayist (born 1849)
- 1918 – James Gordon Bennett, Jr., American journalist and publisher (born 1841)
- 1919 – Henry J. Heinz, American businessman, founded the H. J. Heinz Company (born 1844)
- 1923 – N. G. Chandavarkar, Indian jurist and politician (born 1855)
- 1923 – Charles de Freycinet, French engineer and politician, 43rd Prime Minister of France (born 1828)
- 1931 – David Belasco, American director, producer, and playwright (born 1853)
- 1934 – Lou Criger, American baseball player and manager (born 1872)
- 1935 – Magnus Hirschfeld, German physician and sexologist (born 1868)
- 1936 – Edmund Allenby, 1st Viscount Allenby, English field marshal and diplomat, British High Commissioner in Egypt (born 1861)
- 1940 – Emma Goldman, Lithuanian author and activist (born 1869)
- 1940 – Menno ter Braak, Dutch author (born 1902)
- 1943 – Henri La Fontaine, Belgian lawyer and author, Nobel Prize laureate (born 1854)
- 1945 – Heber J. Grant, American religious leader, 7th President of The Church of Jesus Christ of Latter-day Saints (born 1856)
- 1945 – Wolfgang Lüth, Latvian-German captain (born 1913)
- 1945 – Isis Pogson, English astronomer and meteorologist (born 1852)
- 1953 – Yasuo Kuniyoshi, American painter and photographer (born 1893)
- 1954 – Heinz Guderian, Prussian-German general (born 1888)
- 1956 – Joan Malleson, English physician (born 1889)
- 1957 – Marie Vassilieff, Russian-French painter (born 1884)
- 1959 – Sidney Bechet, American saxophonist, clarinet player, and composer (born 1897)
- 1959 – Infanta Maria Antonia of Portugal (born 1862)
- 1960 – Lucrezia Bori, Spanish soprano and actress (born 1887)
- 1962 – Florence Auer, American actress and screenwriter (born 1880)
- 1965 – Frances Perkins, American workers-rights advocate, U.S. Secretary of Labor (born 1880)
- 1968 – Husband E. Kimmel, American admiral (born 1882)
- 1969 – Enid Bennett, Australian-American actress (born 1893)
- 1969 – Frederick Lane, Australian swimmer (born 1888)
- 1970 – Billie Burke, American actress and singer (born 1884)
- 1973 – Jean Gebser, German linguist, philosopher, and poet (born 1905)
- 1976 – Keith Relf, English singer-songwriter, harmonica player, and producer (born 1943)
- 1979 – Jean Rhys, Dominican-English novelist (born 1890)
- 1980 – Hugh Griffith, Welsh actor (born 1912)
- 1982 – Hugh Beaumont, American actor (born 1909)
- 1983 – Roger J. Traynor, American academic and jurist, 23rd Chief Justice of California (born 1900)
- 1983 – Miguel Alemán Valdés, Mexican politician, 46th President of Mexico (born 1900)
- 1984 – Ted Hicks, Australian public servant and diplomat, Australian High Commissioner to New Zealand (born 1910)
- 1984 – Walter Rauff, German SS officer (born 1906)
- 1987 – Rita Hayworth, American actress and dancer (born 1918)
- 1987 – Vitomil Zupan, Slovenian poet and playwright (born 1914)
- 1988 – Willem Drees, Dutch politician and historian, Prime Minister of the Netherlands (1948–1958) (born 1886)
- 1991 – Aladár Gerevich, Hungarian fencer (born 1910)
- 1991 – Jiang Qing, Chinese revolutionary, actress, and politician, member of the Gang of Four (born 1914)
- 1992 – Nie Rongzhen, Chinese general and politician, Mayor of Beijing (born 1899)
- 1993 – William Randolph Hearst, Jr., American journalist and publisher (born 1908)
- 1994 – Cihat Arman, Turkish footballer and manager (born 1915)
- 1994 – W. Graham Claytor Jr., American businessman, lieutenant, and politician, 15th United States Secretary of the Navy (born 1914)
- 1995 – Christian B. Anfinsen, American biochemist and academic, Nobel Prize laureate (born 1916)
- 1997 – Harry Blackstone Jr., American magician and author (born 1934)
- 1997 – Boris Parsadanian, Armenian-Estonian violinist and composer (born 1925)
- 1998 – Marjory Stoneman Douglas, American journalist and environmentalist (born 1890)
- 1998 – Frank Sinatra, American singer and actor (born 1915)
- 2000 – Keizō Obuchi, Japanese politician, 84th Prime Minister of Japan (born 1937)
- 2001 – Paul Bénichou, French writer, intellectual, critic, and literary historian (born 1908)
- 2001 – Gil Langley, Australian cricketer, footballer, and politician (born 1919)
- 2003 – Dave DeBusschere, American basketball player and coach (born 1940)
- 2003 – Wendy Hiller, English actress (born 1912)
- 2003 – Robert Stack, American actor and producer (born 1919)
- 2004 – Anna Lee, English-American actress (born 1913)
- 2005 – Jimmy Martin, American musician (born 1927)
- 2006 – Lew Anderson, American actor and saxophonist (born 1922)
- 2006 – Stanley Kunitz, American poet and translator (born 1905)
- 2006 – Eva Norvind, Mexican actress, director, and producer (born 1944)
- 2007 – Mary Scheier, American sculptor and educator (born 1908)
- 2007 – Ülo Jõgi, Estonian historian and author (born 1921)
- 2010 – Frank J. Dodd, American businessman and politician, president of the New Jersey Senate (born 1938)
- 2010 – Norman Hand, American football player (born 1972)
- 2010 – Goh Keng Swee, Singaporean soldier and politician, 2nd Deputy Prime Minister of Singapore (born 1918)
- 2012 – Ernst Hinterberger, Austrian author and screenwriter (born 1931)
- 2012 – Mario Trejo, Argentinian poet, playwright, and journalist (born 1926)
- 2013 – Wayne Brown, American accountant and politician, 14th Mayor of Mesa (born 1936)
- 2013 – Arsen Chilingaryan, Armenian footballer and manager (born 1962)
- 2013 – Asghar Ali Engineer, Indian author and activist (born 1939)
- 2013 – Ray Guy, Canadian journalist (born 1939)
- 2014 – Jeffrey Kruger, English-American businessman (born 1931)
- 2014 – Emanuel Raymond Lewis, American librarian and author (born 1928)
- 2014 – Morvin Simon, New Zealand historian, composer, and conductor (born 1944)
- 2015 – B.B. King, American singer-songwriter, guitarist, and producer (born 1925)
- 2015 – Micheál O'Brien, Irish footballer and hurler (born 1923)
- 2015 – Stanton J. Peale, American astrophysicist and academic (born 1937)
- 2015 – Franz Wright, Austrian-American poet and translator (born 1953)
- 2016 – Darwyn Cooke, American comic book writer and artist (born 1962)
- 2017 – Powers Boothe, American actor (born 1948)
- 2018 – Tom Wolfe, American author (born 1931)
- 2019 – Tim Conway, American actor, writer, and comedian (born 1933)
- 2019 – Grumpy Cat, American cat and internet meme celebrity (born 2012)
- 2023 – Doyle Brunson, American poker player (born 1933)
- 2023 – Samantha Weinstein, Canadian actress (born 1995)
- 2024 – Don Perlin, American comic book artist, writer, and editor (born 1929)
- 2024 – Netiporn Sanesangkhom, Thai political activist (born 1995)
- 2026 – Alan Rothwell, English actor (born 1937)
- 2026 – Hans van Houwelingen, Dutch mathematician and professor emeritus of medical statistics (born 1945)

== Holidays and observances ==
- Christian feast day:
  - Boniface of Tarsus
  - Justa, Justina and Henedina
  - Maria Domenica Mazzarello
  - Matthias the Apostle (Roman Catholic Church, Anglican Communion, Evangelical Lutheran Church in America)
  - Michael Garicoïts
  - Mo Chutu of Lismore (Roman Catholic Church)
  - Théodore Guérin
  - Victor and Corona
  - May 14 (Eastern Orthodox liturgics)
- Independence Day (Paraguay)
- Hastings Banda's Birthday (Malawi)
- National Unification Day (Liberia)
- The first day of Izumo-taisha Shrine Grand Festival. (Izumo-taisha)
