= Setkya Dewi =

Chief Queen of Burma from 1853 to 1876

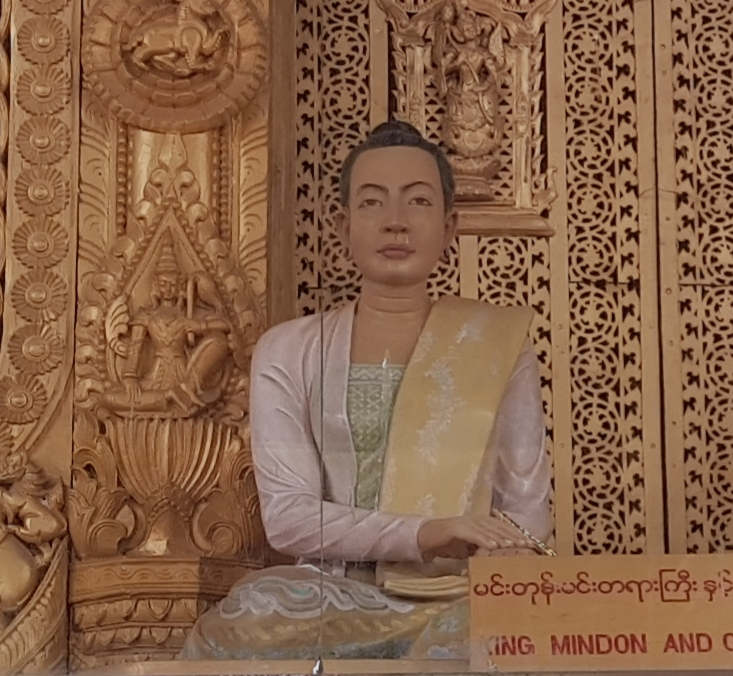
- Statue of Setkya Dewi at Mandalay Palace

Chief Queen of Burma
- Tenure: 26 March 1853 – 12 November 1876
- Coronation: 14 May 1857
- Predecessor: Min Shwe Kyu
- Successor: Supayagyi
- Born: Supaya; 23 December 1813; Amarapura, Burma
- Died: 12 November 1876 (aged 62); Mandalay, Burma
- Burial: Mandalay Palace, Mandalay, Burma
- Spouse: Mindon Min
Regnal name
- Thiri Pawara Atula Tilawka Maha Yazeinda Adhipati Yadana Dewi
- House: Konbaung
- Father: Tharrawaddy Min
- Mother: Thiri Pawara Tilawka Maha Yadana Paduma Dewi
- Religion: Theravada Buddhism

Thiri Pawara Atula Tilawka Maha Yazeinda Adhipati Yadana Dewi (Pali: Sīripavara Atulatiloka Mahārājindādhipati Ratanādevī; Burmese: သီရိပဝရ အတုလတိလောက မဟာရာဇိန္ဒာဓိပတိ ရတနာဒေဝီ; born Supaya; 23 December 1813 – 12 November 1876), commonly known as Setkya Dewi (Burmese: စကြာဒေဝီ; Pali: Cakrādevī), was the chief queen of Mindon Min of the Konbaung Kingdom from 1853 until her death in 1876. A daughter of Tharrawaddy Min, she was designated Princess Tabindaing (chief queen designate) during her father's reign and held the senior female position at court under both Tharrawaddy and Mindon.

Educated at the Amarapura court, Setkya Dewi was noted for her learning in astrology, traditional Burmese Bedin, (Note: Burmese version of astrology) the Vedas, Western astronomy, and the English language. British contemporaries described her as an erudite "bluestocking", and foreign envoys frequently presented her with scientific and astronomical instruments. As Thameedawgyi (princess royal) and Hnamadaw (king's sister), she acted as a political adviser, held extensive appanages, and uniquely received the Jīvita Dāna (Life Release) honour, which empowered her to commute death sentences.

Following Mindon Min's accession in 1853, Setkya Dewi was installed as his chief queen consort and crowned alongside him in 1857. As queen, she played a central role in the ceremonial and religious life of the Konbaung court, participating in major coronation rites, merit-making projects, and acts of royal clemency. She died in 1876 after a prolonged illness and was honoured with a state funeral and a royal tomb within the grounds of the Mandalay Palace.

== Early life and education ==
Setkya Dewi was born Supaya on 23 December 1813 at the House of Thayet in the Amarapura Palace, Amarapura, during the reign of her great-grandfather King Bodawpaya. Her father, the Prince of Thayet (later Tharrawaddy Min), (Note: Tharrawaddy Min received the appanage of Thayet during Bodawpaya's reign and that of Tharrawaddy during Bagyidaw's reign.) was a son of Crown Prince Thado Minsaw, Prince of Shwedaung, and the Princess of Taungdwingyi. Her mother, the Princess of Kyapin, was the daughter of Thiha Thura Maha Dhamma Yaza, Viceroy of Pagan, and Min Shwe Nan, a daughter of Hsinbyushin and his chief queen. Setkya Dewi had seven siblings, five of whom died young; her elder brother was Pagan Min, who later abdicated in favour of her husband, Mindon Min. She and her husband were also half-siblings, as Mindon Min was a son of Tharrawaddy Min and the Queen of the Southern Palace.

Setkya Dewi was educated at home, and her strongest subject was astrology. She studied both the traditional Burmese Bedin and the Vedas. She learned English under her grandfather, the Prince of Mekkhaya, and acquired knowledge of Western astronomy from Charles Lane, an English merchant. She was highly regarded by British visitors, who frequently brought her gifts related to her scientific interests. In a letter to Major Arthur Phayre on 21 May 1853, Lord Dalhousie described her as "the Queen with such very blue stockings". When Phayre arrived at the Amarapura court on 17 September 1855, he presented her with a telescope.

== Thameedawgyi (1837–1846) ==
Upon the abdication of Setkya Dewi's paternal uncle Sagaing Min following a forty-day palace revolution that began on 24 February 1837, her father ascended the throne on 30 April that year. Setkya Dewi consequently assumed the position of Thameedawgyi (Note: Burmese: သမီးတော်ကြီး, lit. 'Royal great daughter') (the equivalent of Princess Royal). On 31 May 1837, she was granted the appanages of Sagaing, Myede, Kyangin, Dala, and Tharrawaddy. (Note: Members of the royal family above a certain age were granted appanages as a source of income. They also exercised authority in the local administration of their respective territories and were permitted to engage in moneylending, deriving income from the interest accrued on silver loans.) At her father's Rājjābhiseka coronation ceremony, held from 10 to 12 July 1840—a date chosen by her–Setkya Dewi was conferred the title Thiri Pawara Tilawka Yadana Mingala Dewi (Pali: Sīripavara Tiloka Ratanā Maṅgalā Devī; Burmese: သီရိပဝရ တိလောကရတနာ မင်္ဂလာဒေဝီ). She was styled Princess Tabindaing and her father designated her as the future chief queen of the next monarch. (Note: The princess so designated is sequestered in a separate palace and remains unmarried, as she is expected to become the chief queen when the heir apparent eventually ascends the throne.)

Acting as an adviser to her father, Setkya Dewi was bestowed the newly established honour of Jīvita Dāna (Burmese: အသက်ဒါနဆု, Athet Dāna Hsu; lit. 'Life release award'). This distinction conferred upon her the authority to grant clemency to individuals sentenced to death, particularly those prosecuted as political prisoners during succession crises. She retained this prerogative into the reign of Mindon Min. She was the first and only princess in Burmese history to receive such an honour. Through her intervention, approximately fourteen people were absolved of their guilt, including Sagaing Min, Myawaddy Mingyi U Sa, Hsinbyumashin, Yaw Mingyi U Pho Hlaing, and Hlaing Hteik Khaung Tin.

=== Ear-boring ceremony ===
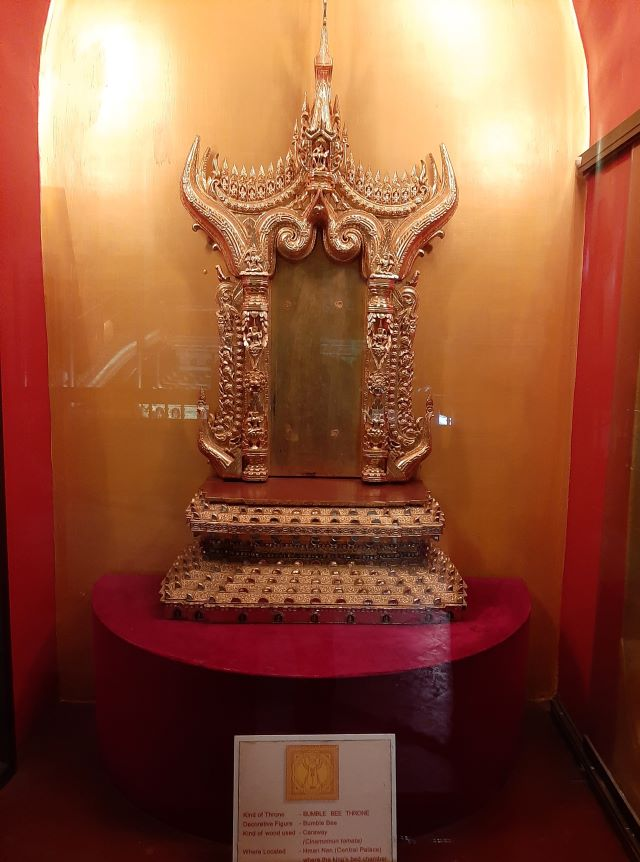
The Bhamarāsana Throne

A festival honouring the kaṇṇavijjhana maṅgalā (ear-boring ceremony) of Setkya Dewi was held from 8 to 28 November 1840 in Amarapura, beginning with a Thingyandaw bathing rite. At around 8:00 a.m. on 11 November, a ceremony performing the ear-boring, hair-knotting, shawl-wrapping, and necklace-wearing rites for Setkya Dewi took place before the Bhamarāsana Throne in the Glass Palace. Her maids of honour were the Princesses of Hlaing, Pindale, Yinge, Taungtha, Nyaung-oke, and Saw-hla. A simultaneous hair-knotting and ear-boring service was conducted for the Princes of Padein, Tayoke-myaw, and Mindat.

As part of the ceremony, forty-two prisoners were released. Bolts of paso, gaung baung, and cotton cloth were distributed to princes, ministers, counsellors, su-yays, (Note: Burmese: စုရေး; officials responsible for keeping the records of a corps of troops) and su-gaings. (Note: Burmese: စုကိုင်; officials entrusted with administering a corps of troops) Additionally, pasos, htameins, gaung baungs, scarves, and towels were given in charity to attendees. On 28 December 1840, at the Southern Samote Hall, (Note: Burmese: တောင်စမုတ်ဆောင်, Taung Samote Hsaung; lit. 'Southern gatehouse') food offerings were made to 1,200 monks from surrounding kyaungs. Further offerings were made to 1,000 monks on 3 January 1841.

== Hnamadaw (1846–1853) ==
Setkya Dewi's brother Pagan Min acceded to the throne following their father's death on 17 November 1846, and Setkya Dewi therefore became Hnamadaw (Note: Burmese: နှမတော်; lit. 'Royal younger sister') while retaining her position as Princess Tabindaing. At the opening ceremony of the royal hti and throne on 27 February 1847, she was granted the appanages of Sagaing, Singu, Kyaukmyaung, Myede, Kyangin, Tharrawaddy, Dala, and Taungoo. The King further entrusted her with the duty of caring for the Queen Mother on his behalf. Maha Thiha Minhtin was appointed hnamadaw-wun (Note: Burmese: နှမတော်ဝန်; lit. 'Minister of Hnamadaw') to serve as her private secretary.

== Queen consort (1853–1876) ==
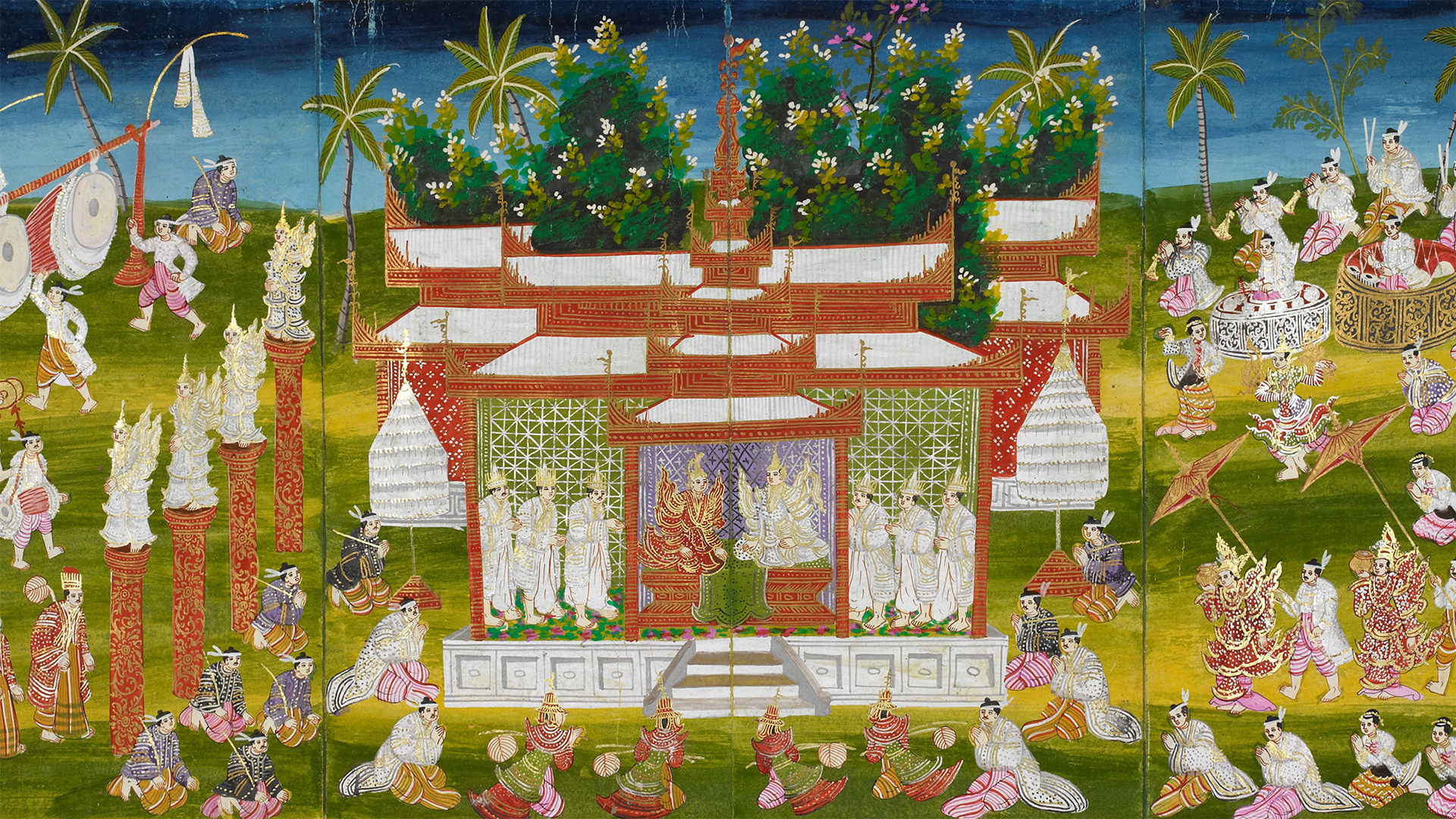
A painting depicting the coronation of Mindon Min and Setkya Dewi, illustrating the royal ceremony and court attendants

In the aftermath of the Second Anglo–Burmese War, Mindon Min ascended the throne following a succession conflict with his half-brother Pagan Min. Mindon Min and his brother Kanaung Min, accompanied by their immediate family and retainers, left the capital through Laygyun Gate of the northernmost front moat after 6 p.m. on 18 December 1852. They fled to Shwebo, the ancestral seat of King Alaungpaya, arriving shortly after midday on 21 December 1852.

The succession dispute was resolved on 17 February 1853, with Pagan Min being overthrown and placed under house arrest. Setkya Dewi, the Queen Mother, Ayeedaw (Note: Burmese: အရီးတော်; lit. 'Royal paternal aunt') Myingun Mibaya, Thiri Tilawka Maha Yadana Dewi, and the Princesses of Hlaing, Pindale, and Yinge were brought to pandals in the court of Shwebo on 10 March 1853. Around 1:36 a.m. on 26 March, Setkya Dewi was installed as the chief queen consort in front of the Great Audience Hall. During the ugindaw bwint (lit. 'opening of the royal palace') ceremony of 16 June 1854 at the Amarapura Palace, she assumed the regnal title Thiri Pawara Maha Yazeinda Yadana Dewi. She was two years older than her husband, and Mindon Min referred to her affectionately as Amadaw or Ma-phaya (lit. 'Royal elder sister'). Mindon Min and Setkya Dewi's coronation ceremony was held on 14 May 1857 at the newly built Mandalay Palace.

== Illness and death ==
On 26 August 1876, Setkya Dewi fell ill the day after accompanying her husband on a visit to the royal gardens by royal boat. She had previously fallen ill on 7 August that year but recovered after ten days. This second illness proved more serious. Eight physicians, together with her personal doctors Naymyo Thekka Nawratha and Meikhtila Saya, attended her. Their work was supervised by Mingyi (Note: Minister of first rank) Maha Mingaung Thinkhayar, Myosa (Duke) of Hlaingtet and Wundauk (Note: Minister of third rank) of Kinnzin, (Note: Kinnzin refers to the king's guards; the Wundauk of Kinnzin was the minister responsible for the guards) and Mingyi Minhla Maha Sithu, Myosa of Wetmasut and minister for Shwepyi. (Note: Minister in charge of the community of gun corps residing in the Shwepyi ward) Later, a German physician, Minkyaw Theiddi Bithekka Pyinnnyar, who served as minister for forestry, was added to the medical team. The Myosas of Yaw and Myothit presented the Queen with eight golden htis, which her brother Pagan Min, the former king, brought to the southern royal garden where she resided.

As acts of merit for Setkya Dewi's recovery, a budget of 170,000 kyats was allocated from the royal treasury. Sixty-five bridges were repaired, and sixty-five prisoners were released. Beginning on 2 October 1876, daily food offerings were made to sixty-five monks at the Zetawun Hall. Ten sayadaws from the city presided over a three-day recitation of the Paṭṭhāna, Bojjanga Sutta, and Mahāsatipaṭṭhāna Sutta, which Setkya Dewi listened to attentively. The Queen died on 12 November 1876 at around 11:06 a.m., reportedly while listening to the recitations of the sayadaws.

== State funeral ==
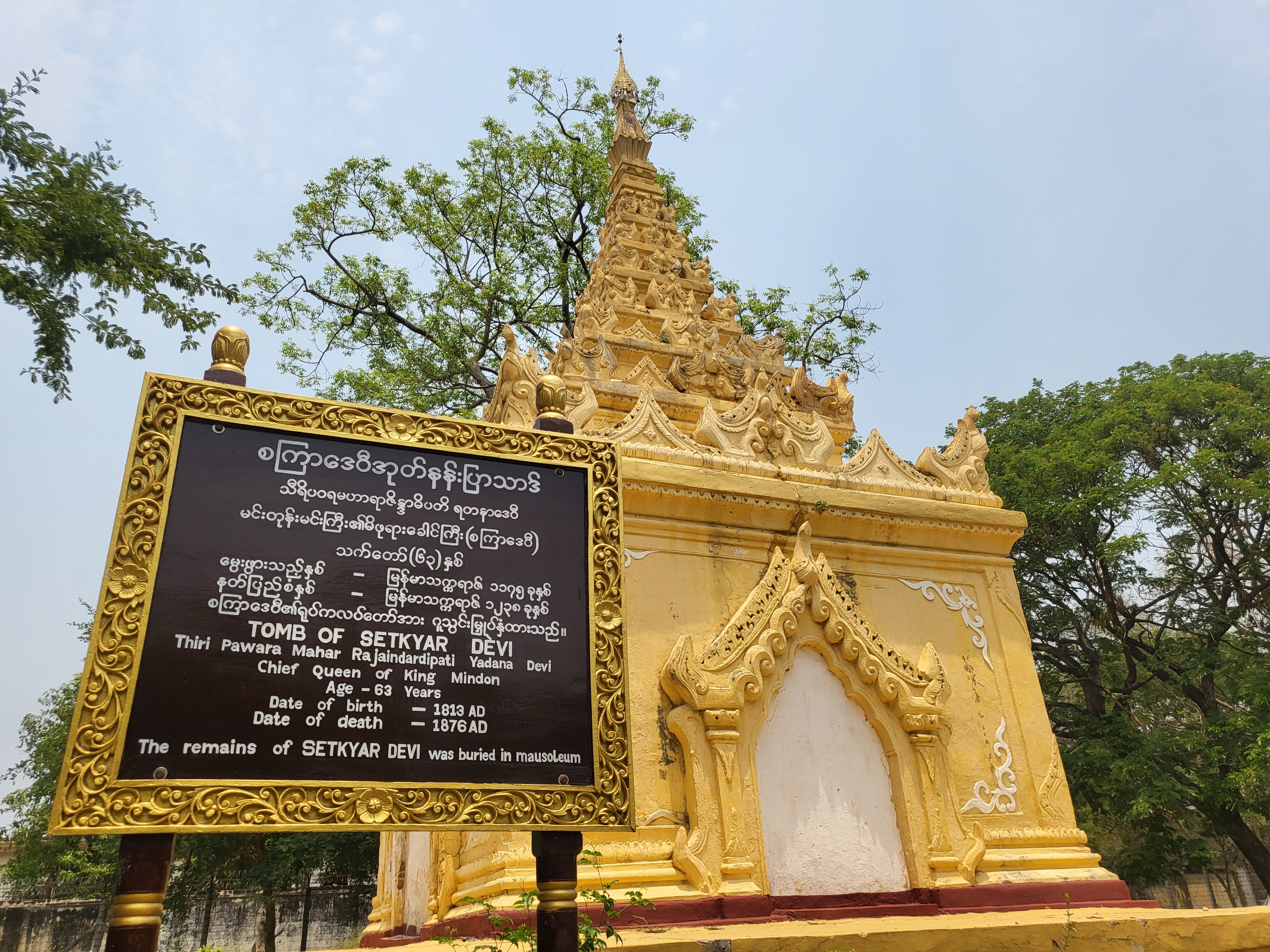
The tomb of Setkya Dewi in Mandalay Palace

Setkya Dewi's remains were prepared for lying in state, overseen by her husband, her brother Pagan Min, and her sister the Queen of the Western Palace. Her body was placed in the coffin on 14 November. A statue of Setkya Dewi was created under the supervision of the Myosa of Khanpet, using 5.55 viss of gold. Mindon Min himself supervised the daily construction of the royal tomb in the northern royal garden, and the Myosas of Khanpet and Hlaingtet were instructed to oversee the work.

The procession to the royal tomb took place on 2 December 1876. The bier was carried first by the elder princes to the Western Samote Hall, including the Princes of Thonze, Mekkhaya, Nyaungyan, Nyaungok, and Thibaw. From there, it was borne by the Princes of Taungnyo, Myinsaing, and Htantabin and other sons and grandsons of Kanaung Min to the royal tomb. From the tomb itself, the body was carried by the Queen of the Central Palace, the Queen of the Western Palace, and other mibayas and princesses to the funeral pyre. Mindon Min held royal audience at the royal tomb for three months following her death and thereafter wore white cloth exclusively.

== In popular culture ==
Her personality and role were adapted into a character in the Thai television drama The Royal Fire, where she was portrayed as Queen Sekkharadevi by Priyanuch Panpradab in 1996 and by Chiranan Manochaem in 2017.

== Ancestry ==
Ancestors of Setkya Dewi

8. King Bodawpaya of Burma
4. Crown Prince Thado Minsaw, Prince of Shwedaung
9. Thiri Maha Sandabhi Yadana Dewi, Queen of the Northern Palace
2. Tharrawaddy Min of Burma
10. King Bodawpaya
5. Thiri Tilawka Maha Thubhatta Yadana Dewi, Princess of Taungdwingyi
11. Thiri Pawara Maha Yazeinda Mingala Yadana Dewi, Queen of the Southern Palace
1. Thiri Pawara Atula Tilawka Maha Yazeinda Adhipati Yadana Dewi
12. King Bodawpaya
6. Thiha Thura Maha Dhamma Yaza, Viceroy of Pagan
13. Thiri Maha Mingala Dewi, Queen of the Southern Apartment
3. Thiri Pawara Tilawka Maha Yadana Paduma Dewi, Queen of the Southern Palace
14. King Hsinbyushin of Burma
7. Min Shwe Nan
15. Thiri Atula Yadana Padumma Dewi, Queen of the Southern Palace
