= Pin Hteik Khaung Tin =

Thiri Thuketha Dewi of Pin
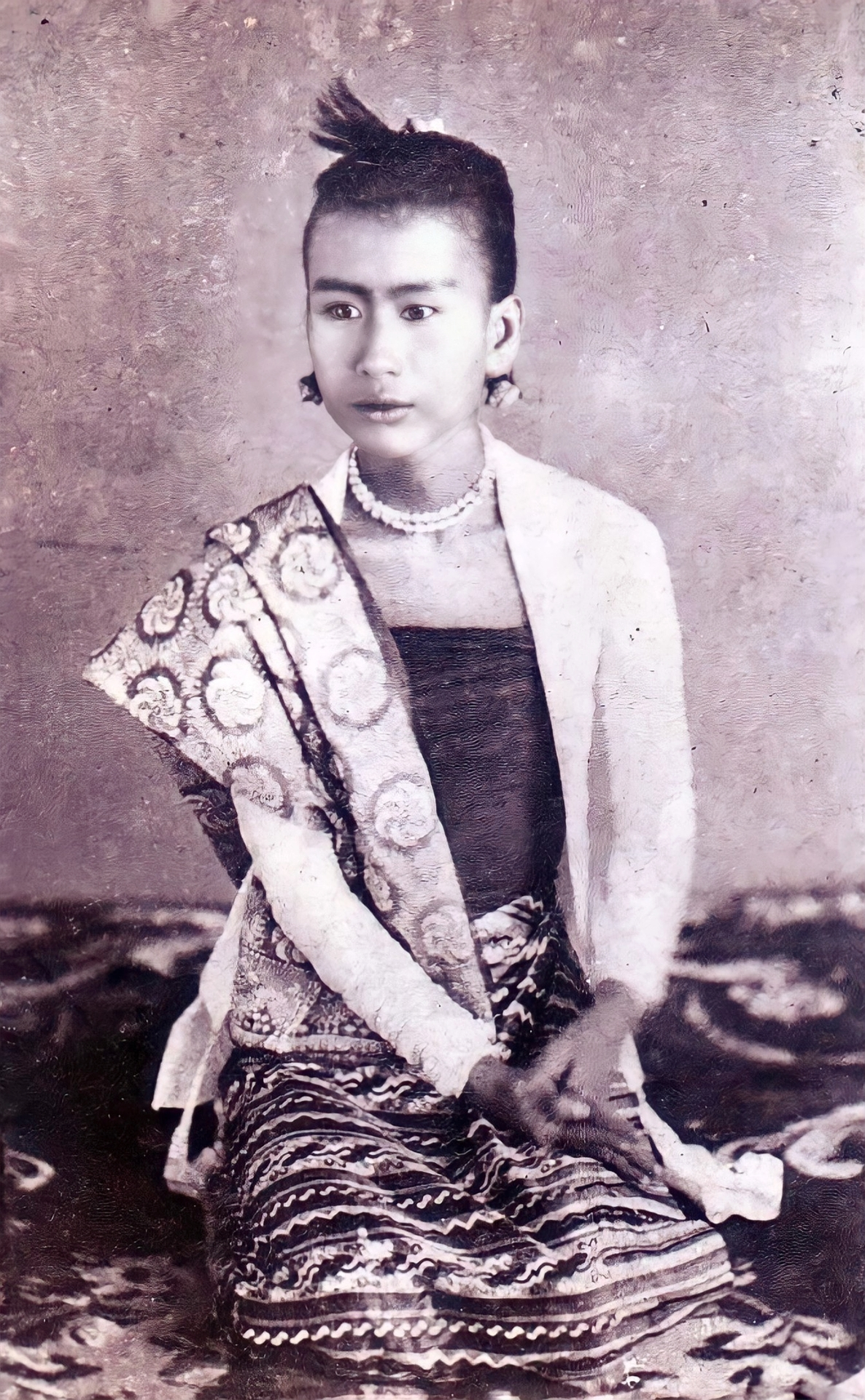
- Princess of Pin

Princess of Pin
- Reign: 17 October 1857 – 1882/83
- Predecessor: ?
- Successor: disestablished

Princess of Mohlaing
- Reign: 16 June 1854 – 17 October 1857
- Born: unknown Amarapura, Konbaung Burma
- Died: 1882/83; 1244 ME; Mandalay, Konbaung Burma
- Spouse: Prince Myo Tu of Mekkhaya (m. 1863, divorced)
- Issue: none
Regnal name
- Thiri Thuketha Dewi
- House: Konbaung
- Father: Mindon Min
- Mother: Zabwedaung Mibaya

Thiri Thuketha Dewi (သီရိသုကေသာဒေဝီ; Sīrisukesādevī, commonly known as Pin Hteik Khaung Tin (Burmese: ပင်း ထိပ်ခေါင်တင်; d. 1882/83), was a Burmese royal princess during the late Konbaung period. She was one of the three virgin daughters of King Mindon.

== Life ==
The princess, the second of four siblings, was born to King Mindon and his consort Zabwedaung Mibaya. Her eldest sister and youngest brother died at a young age; only her younger sister Momeik Princess survived to adulthood.

At the opening ceremony of King Mindon's royal palace (ဥကင်တော်ဖွင့် မင်္ဂလာ) on 14 June 1854, (Note: 6th waning of Nayon 1216 ME (16 June 1854)) she was granted the title of Thiri Thuketha Wadi. She was later promoted to Thiri Thuketha Dewi. She was granted the appanages of Mohlaing. When her mother died on 17 October 1857, (Note: 1st waxing of Tazaungmon 1219 ME (17 October 1857)) she received the appanage of Pin and was hence known as Pin Hteik Khaung Tin. She and her sister were adopted by Queen Setkya Dewi after their mother's death.

The princess married Prince Myo Tu of Mekkhaya on 30 November 1863. (Note: 6th waxing of Nadaw 1225 ME (30 November 1863)) However the marriage was never consummated; he already had six concubines. He wouldn’t even visit her chamber at any point. She was greatly embarrassed by this and repeatedly complained to her father, the king. Eventually, the king relented and allowed the divorce to proceed. She never married again.

The princess died in 1882/83. (Note: 1244 ME (15 April 1882 – 14 April 1883))

== Bibliography ==
- Collection of Thet-Kayit: Money Lending Contracts of Myanmar Rural Area in Kon-baung Period. Vol. 1. Aichi University. 1999.
- Hteiktin Htwe, Naga Bo (1967). ရတနာသိင်္ဃ ကုန်းဘောင် မဟာရာဇဝင် အကျဉ်း [Abbreviated History of Yadana Theinga Konbaung Dynasty] (in Burmese). Yangon: Aye.
- Than Swe (Dawei), Maung (1999). ကုန်းဘောင် ရှင်းတမ်း [Expositions on Konbaung Period Topics] (in Burmese). Yangon: Ya-Pyae. pp. 149–151.
