= Coronation of Mindon Min =

1857 ceremony in Mandalay, Burma

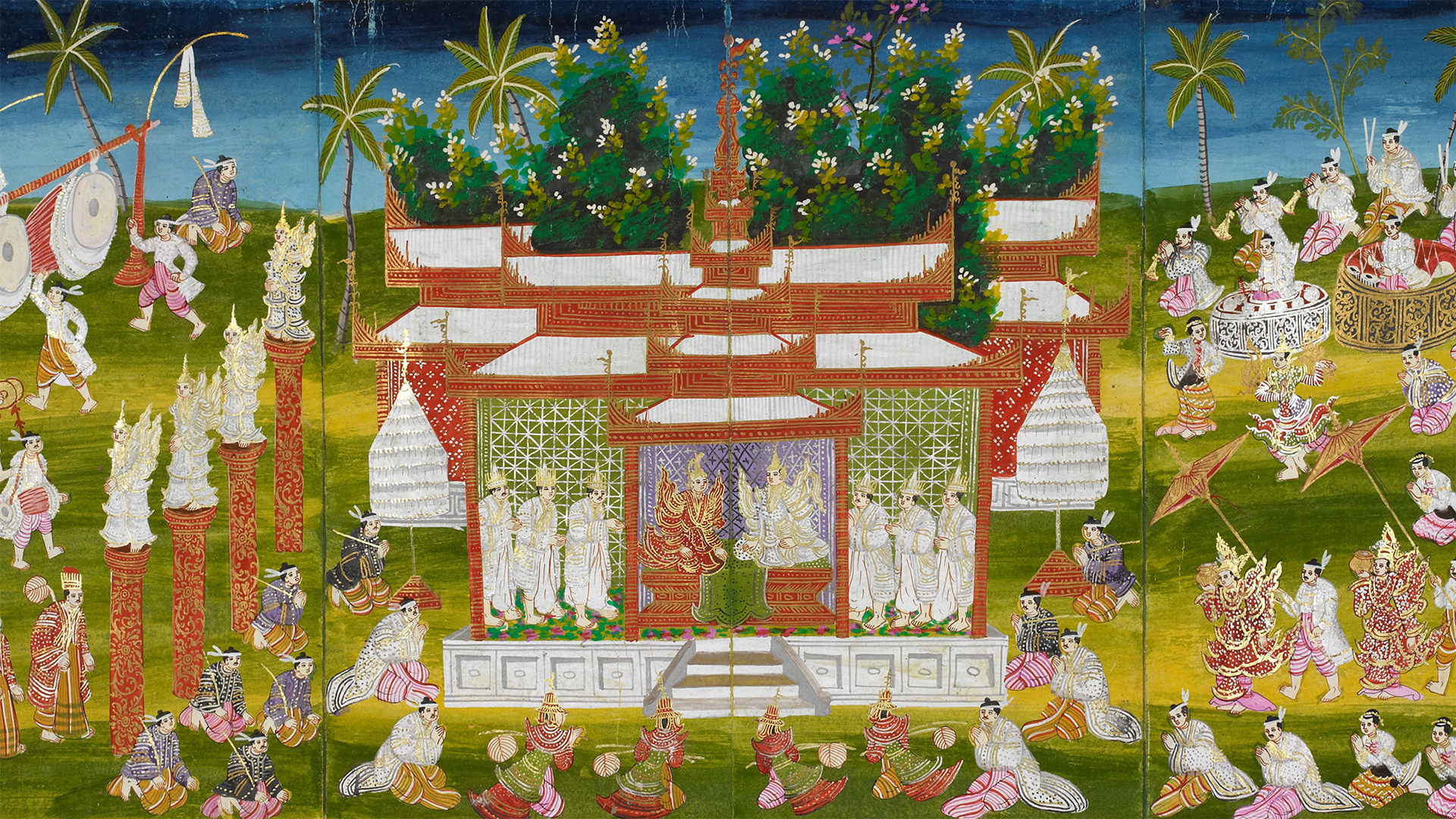
- A contemporaneous painting of the coronation depicts the king and queen seated in the pavilion, surrounded by a retinue of Brahmins.
- Native name: မင်းတုန်းမင်း ရာဇာဘိသေက မုဒ္ဓါဘိသိက် ခံယူတော်မူပုံ
- English name: Rājābhiseka Muddhābhisik (consecration) ceremony of Mindon Min
- Date: 14 May 1857
- Venue: Mandalay Palace
- Location: Mandalay, Burma
- Participants: Mindon Min; Setkya Dewi; Mibayas and children; Thathanabaing sayadaw; Brahmins

The coronation (Rajabhiseka) of Mindon Min and Setkya Dewi as king and queen of the Konbaung Kingdom in Burma took place at Mandalay Palace on 14 May 1857.

During the reign of the king's half brother Pagan Min, the Second Anglo-Burmese War in 1852 ended with the annexation of Lower Burma by the British Empire. Mindon Min and his younger brother Kanaung Min overthrew Pagan Min, and Mindon Min ascended the throne on 18 February 1853.

Similar to other southeast Asian traditions, the coronation ceremony was a mix of Hindu and Buddhist cultures in which Punna (Brahmins) played significant roles, as Hindu texts provide guidelines for such social rituals and political ceremonies, while Buddhist texts do not. (Note: Some Brahmins formed an influential group in Burmese Buddhist kingdoms in 18th- and 19th-century. The court Brahmins were locally called Punna. During the Konbaung dynasty, Buddhist kings relied on their court Brahmins to consecrate them to kingship in elaborate ceremonies, and to help resolve political questions. This role of Hindu Brahmins in a Buddhist kingdom, states Leider, may have been because Hindu texts provide guidelines for such social rituals and political ceremonies, while Buddhist texts do not.)

Following ancient customs similar to the coronations of the kings before him, during the service, Mindon Min bathed, took an oath, and was anointed with holy water, invested with regalia, and crowned King of Burma. The oath included instructions on what to do or not do for the benefit of his people and warned him that if he failed to oblige, he might suffer certain punishments.

The coronation was private and attended by royal members and staff only, and Konbaung Set Yazawin shows no evidence survived to indicate attendance by foreign diplomats.

== Preparation ==
=== Choosing regnal titles ===
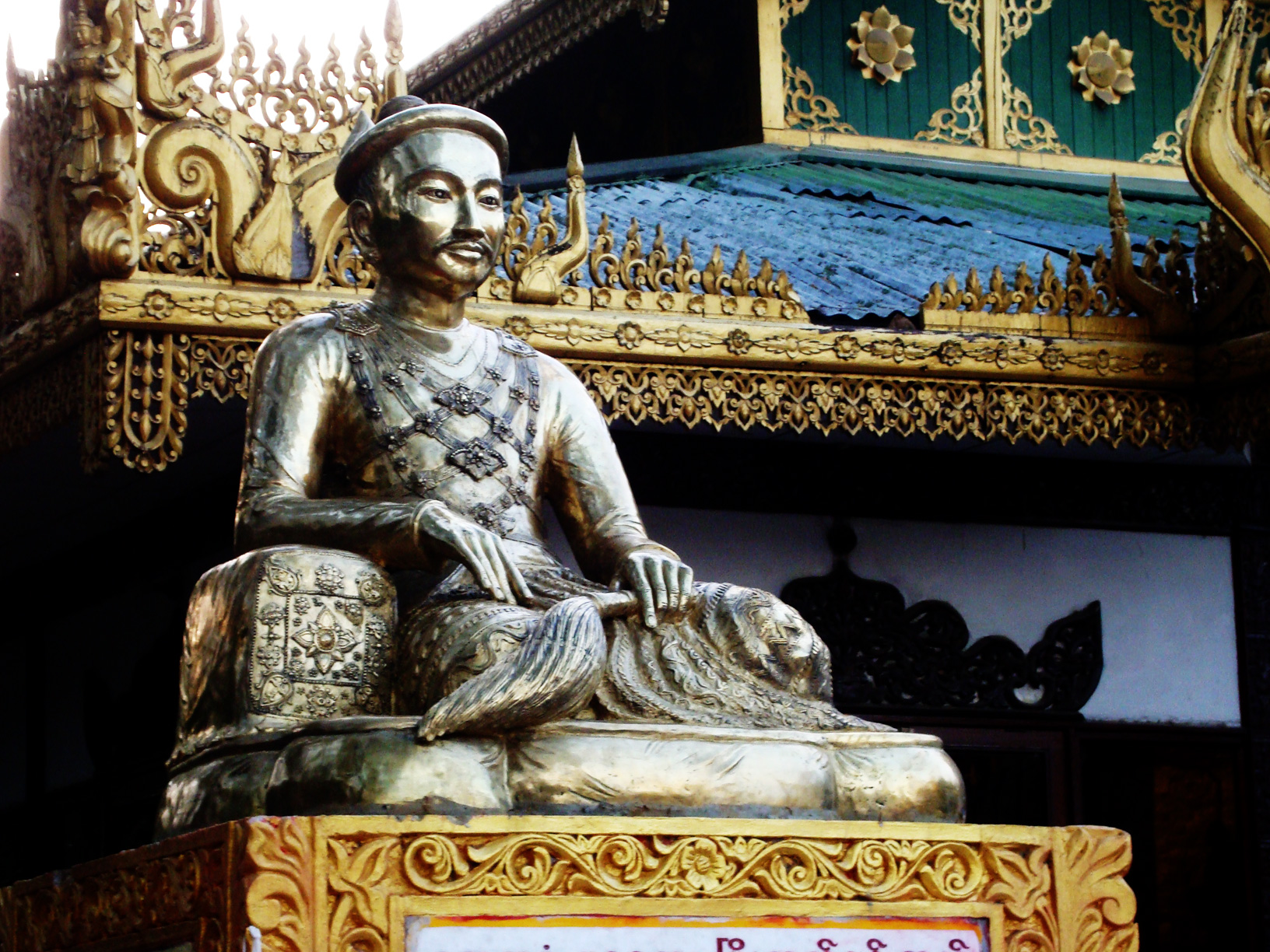
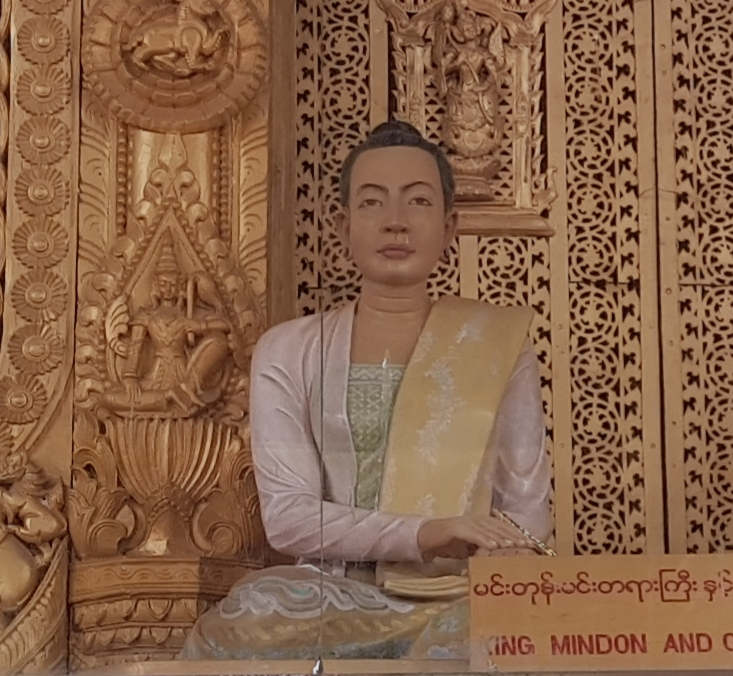
King Mindon (left) and Setkya Dewi (right)

A committee was formed to choose regnal titles for the King and his wife. It was chaired by the Prince of Mekkhaya and consisted of 14 ministers, including Khanpat Mingyi and Maigaing Myoza; five Punna; and eight accomplished and distinguished Rājaguru sayadaws (senior monks): Gwegyo Sayadaw, Seebanni Sayadaw, Mekkhaya Sayadaw, Thitseint Sayadaw, Hladwe Sayadaw, Bhamo Sayadaw, Wicittayama Sayadaw, and Bagan Sayadaw. The committee met at the three-tiered Zetawun Hall and announced on the following day that, in accordance with the Pāli and Vedic Sanskrit grammar and prosody, the regnal titles of the King and the Chief Queen would be Sīripavara Vijayānanta Yasapaṇḍita Tribhavanā Dityādhipati Mahādhammarājādhirājā (Burmese: သီရိပဝရ ဝိဇယာနန္တ ယသပဏ္ဍိတ တြိဘဝနာ ဒိတျာဓိပတိ မဟာဓမ္မရာဇာဓိရာဇာ, lit. 'Prosperous and Most Excellent Great Just King of Kings, Infinitely Victorious, Famous and Wise') and Sīripavara Atulatiloka Mahārājindādhipati Ratanādevī (Burmese: သီရိပဝရ အတုလတိလောက မဟာရာဇိန္ဒာဓိပတိ ရတနာဒေဝီ) respectively. A minister for decorations, Minhla Yaza Kyawhtin, was commissioned to inscribe the titles on the golden palm-leaf manuscripts, which were decorated with nawarat (nine esteemed gems) wound by nine ruby stripes, at an auspicious moment in the same month.

=== Making coronation costumes ===
Managed by the royal treasurers, 23 dressmakers and embroiders wearing nawarat rings made the diamond-decorated silver magaik (Imperial crown), flame-like epaulettes for the duyin, left-and-right sulya (shawls), three-layer shebon (aprons) and bwebyu (robes). The duyin, sulya and shebon, with silver jingle bells decorating the lining, were embroidered with silver silk in the shape of a star, a jackfruit tubercle and a gourd tendril. When the outfits were completed, they were put onto peacock frames, and Buddhist Parittas were chanted by eight monks.

=== Constructing mandats ===
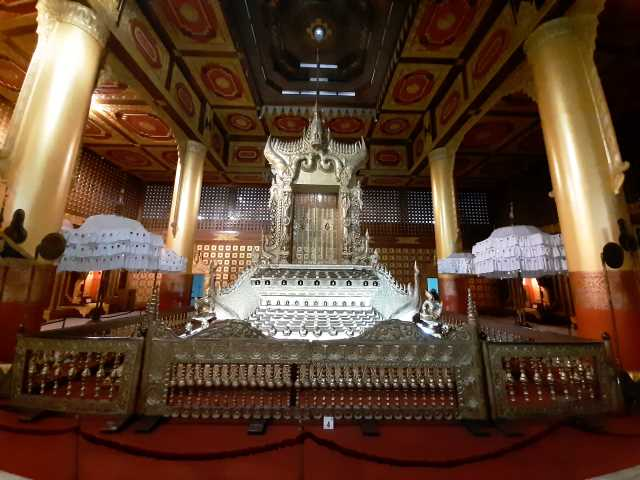
The original Lion Throne at National Museum Yangon

A specially designated plot of land due east of the palace was harrowed by bankers' sons wearing yellow clothes, rich men's sons dressed in red, and farmland-lords' sons wearing green clothes with gold, silver and tin ploughs attached to bulls (not oxen as usual). This was followed by splashing milk, sprinkling cow dung powder and scattering barley, sesame, cotton, maize, rice, peas and beans thoroughly over the ground. The plot was fenced with a type of latticework called Daunggyan. Punna performed fire rituals and started chanting mantras from Rajamattan (Note: A standard reference for ceremonies at the royal court compiled during Bodawpaya's reign) when carts carrying statues of Chandi, Parameshwara and Vishnu arrived. Then, representative monks of all nikayas and 12 court Brahmins recited parittas, such as Maṅgala Sutta and Ratana Sutta, and Kammavaca (Note: A selected collection of sacred Pali texts written in a square script) as Punna devoted to nat spirits blew Khayuthin (conch shells) and chanted the mantra Karanasrishanta.

After wood, bamboo, rattan and building materials were washed with lustral water, eight astrologers and four family members waited while the site was staked by sailors, paritta-chanting Punna and landowners; these were dressed in brown, red and green and held gold, silver and tin stakes respectively. The staking was scheduled to occur under the influence of auspicious constellations and signaled by firing seven flintlocks seven times. The athes (civilians) built three ceremonial mandats (pavilions):

- A Sihasana mandat (with Lion Throne), draped in white and attended by the paritta-reciting Punna.
- A Gajasana mandat (with Elephant Throne), decorated in red with sailors in attendance.
- A Morasana mandat (with Peacock Throne), decked in brown and presented by athes.

=== Collecting anointing water ===
A group of eight supayas with gold pots, eight daughters of puroheits (court Punna) with silver pots, eight daughters of ministers with earthen pots, eight daughters of bankers with brass pots and eight daughters of rich men with iron pots went to the Irrawaddy River together with eight abhiseka-performing Punna led by the Thathanabaing sayadaw. The water had to be taken from midstream; all embarked on separate boats according to their grades.

When they arrived at the riverside, participants dressed up as Ganga (the guardian spirit of the river) said three times, "Why do you all come?" "According to tradition, as in the case of his forbear, the King intends to hold an abhiseka ceremony. Thus have we come to draw water," the puroheits replied. Ganga asked, "Will he work for the religion (Sasana), the Samgha and the people and act according to the law?"; "The King wishes so to act and thus wants the water," they answered.

Ganga said, "Very well! Very well! May the King live a hundred years and look after the interests of the religion, the Samgha and the people. May his children, grandchildren and great-grandchildren prosper," and allowed them to get water.

The holy water obtained by the supayas and daughters of puroheits was placed at the Sihasana mandat, that of the ministers' daughters at the Gajasana mandat and that of the bankers' and rich men's daughters at the Morasana mandat.

== Procession to the mandat ==
The middle part of the route from the palace to the mandats was shaded with gold and silver cloth so that no sunlight could fall on the path.

In the vanguard of the procession were twelve regiments with members of legislatures to the left and right, the front ranks of the palace guard commanders and the left ranks of the palace guard commanders; in the rear were twelve regiments with members of legislatures to the left and right, the back ranks of the palace guard commanders and the right ranks of the palace guard commanders, all formally arranged. These were followed by 100 abhiseka Punna headed by two Chakravartis on each side; the Thathanabaing sayadaw; Brahma Chandra, the Chief Puroheit, carrying a Dakshinavarti Shankh in a golden basket with joined hands; 100 Huyas (astrologer Brahmins); 100 Punna who sacrificed to nat spirits; 100 harpist Punna; 100 Punna reciting parittas; 100 Punna offering flowers; eight princesses; eight Punna's daughters; eight bankers' daughters; and eight rich men's daughters. All 500 Punna blew on Khayuthins. The King and Chief Queen, each proceeded and followed by a princess wearing Ghanamatthaka clothes, processed in a golden palanquin to the akhazaunt mandat to await the auspicious moment for beginning the ceremony.

== Event ==
Preceding the King and Chief Queen into the mandat was the Tipitaka carried by the Thathanabaing sayadaw, Vinayadhara (ဝိနည်းဓိုရ်; custodian of the Vinaya) (Note: A sayadaw learned in the Vinayas who delivers judgement on disputes involving the ecclesiastic code.) and 12 puroheit. After a prescribed interval it was removed to the palace where 108 monks were chanting parittas. Then the palace was cleaned by the Pyisogyi minister (registrar general; ပြည်စိုးကြီးအမတ်).

=== Bathing of the King ===
The King and Chief Queen proceeded to the Morasana mandat and put on the dresses offered by the Nanya Mibayas (Senior Queens); they continued to the Gajasana mandat, where the King was anointed by Myadaung Supaya with Thagyayezin holy water from a golden bowl and by three ministers with 20 golden pots. The King's hairline was washed by Yamethin Supaya and Grahashanti-reciting Bhidra with the Dakshinavarti Shankh. Afterwards, offerings were donated to seven Buddha images. (Note: The seven images represent the seven Buddhas: Gautama Buddha and the six preceding Samma Sambuddhas.)

=== Crowning, anointing and oath-taking ===
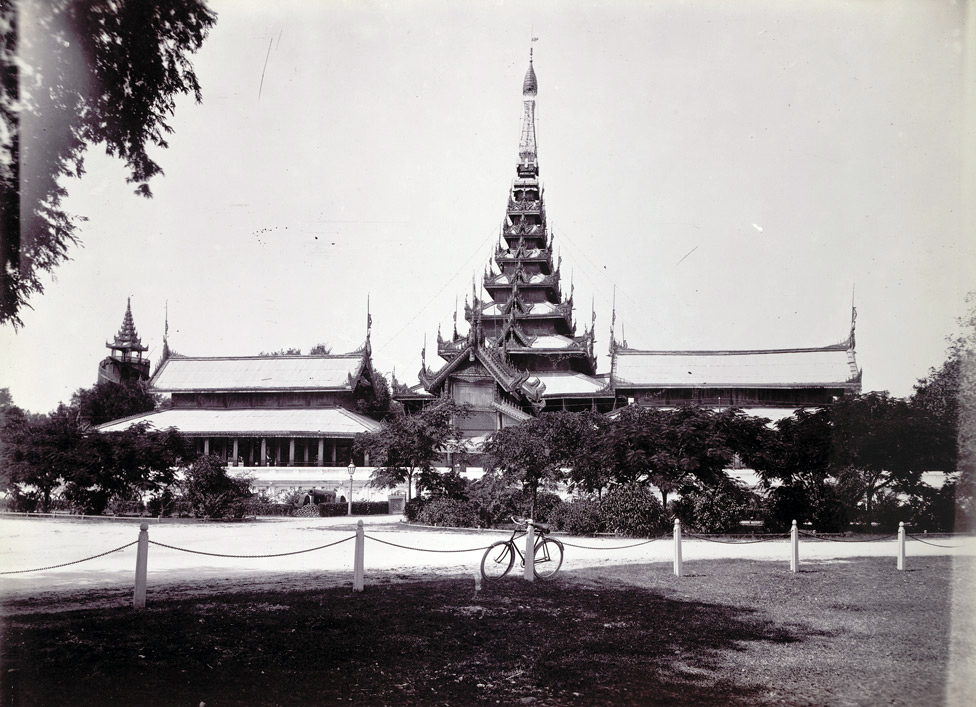
Great Audience Hall where the King was invested with Thanlyet and Taungmway

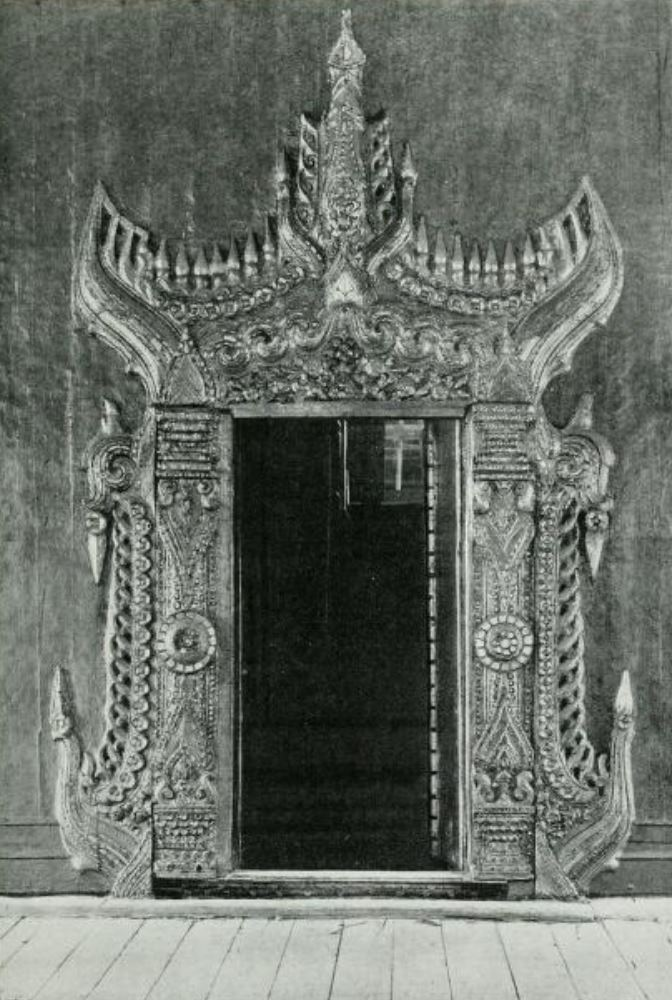
The Ugin, the golden door behind the throne

Around 7 am, the diamond-decorated silver magaik, flame-like epaulettes attached to duyin, left-and-right sulya, three-layer shebon and bwebyu, after being praised by eight Punna, were offered to the King by Mai Noung Supaya, Salin Supaya and Yamethin Supaya in order.

The King and Chief Queen made a variety of donations while the Pyaut Gyi Hmue (captain of the footguards) read the ceremonial yadu (ode); the Navagraha (heavenly deities) were given offerings by Punna. Later, the King and Chief Queen went clockwise round the Sihasana mandat, stopping on the eastern side. In front of the Great Audience Hall, the King was invested with the Thanlyet (sceptre) and Taungmway (staff).

When the princesses opened the U-gin (Note: The uppermost part of the back of the throne.) holding the Thanlyet and Taungmway, the King recited:

Buddhañca Dhammañca Saṃghañca saranaṃ gato, upāsakattaṃ desesi. Sakyaputtassa sāsane, sadāguṇa mupehīti.

(Note: Translation: "Having taken refuge in the Buddha, the Dhamma and the Sangha, he pointed out the fact of his being a lay-disciple. Always trust in the virtue of the biddings of the Sakyaputta. i.e. the Buddha.")

The King and Chief Queen sat in state on the gold-covered figwood in the Sihasana mandat.

Eight Punna handed the King the five components of the coronation regalia: the Hti byu (white umbrella), Magaik, Thanlyet, Che nin (sandals) and Thamee yet (fly-whisk made of yak tail). Yaw Atwinwun read the regnal title of the King from the golden palm-leaf manuscript, which, together with its ruby-studded stand, was then offered to the King by the Prince of Mekkhaya. The regnal title of the Chief Queen was read by Kanni Atwinwun and offered to her by the Prince of Nyaungyan.

At 8:30 am, eight supayas dressed in Ghanamattaka, holding Dakshinavarti Shankh filled with water from five rivers by Yamethin Supaya, poured water on the King's head while saying:

Oh King! please act always as the good and righteous kings from Mahāsammata at the beginning of the world onwards. Oh King! do not be harsh to your vassals, bestow rewards on all deserving people, love compassionately everyone as though they are children of your bosom, guard the welfare of everyone, treasure their lives as though your own. May you be free of the obstructions of greed and anger, and give light to the darkness of stupidity. Oh King! your actions must be only those that bring you credit, so must your words, your thoughts and zeal.

Holding Dakshinavarti Shankh filled by Brahma Chandra the Chief Puroheit, eight Punna of pure blood also anointed the King, saying:

Please make the Sasana and its attributes shine forth. Oh King! love all beings as your own children, their weal and their lives must be as your own. Oh King! do not be harsh to your vassals. Be just, attend to the sayings of the wise, and look after your kith and kin. This you must always do.

Then, holding Dakshinavarti Shankh filled by Maha Thiri Dhanaraja, eight bankers and rich men anointed the King with these words:

Oh King! look after everyone as yourself. Guard their welfare as your own. Do not be harsh to your vassals. Be just in your taxation. Eschew the unjust and the foolish. Consult the wise men and take their advice.

Oh King! May you receive the tax according to the Thathameda law. May the kings of many countries bow their heads before you, may there be no thieves or robbers. Oh King! if you break your oath, may the world be ruined by earthquakes, hell-fires, rebels and witches.

=== End of the event ===
Mindon Min then proclaimed, "I am foremost in all the world! I am most excellent in all the world! I am peerless in all the world!", gave a speech in which he asked to be "victorious over his dangerous enemies" and to "attain the white elephant and the treasures [to become, in other words, Chakravartis]", and made an invocation by pouring water from a golden ewer. The ceremony ended with the king taking refuge in the Three Jewels.

Then bhisikpan (flowers) were offered to eight abhiseka-performing Punna by the minister of royal treasurers, Minhla Sithu. Princesses who had been given the honor of making speeches beat a silver gong and cymbal. Afterward, meals were offered to a Nanthint Buddha image (Note: A Buddha image sculpted to reference a particular planet corresponding to one's name.) before being given away to a person and a cat. About one hour later, the King and Chief Queen had their lunch, then left the Great Audience Hall.

== Commemorations ==
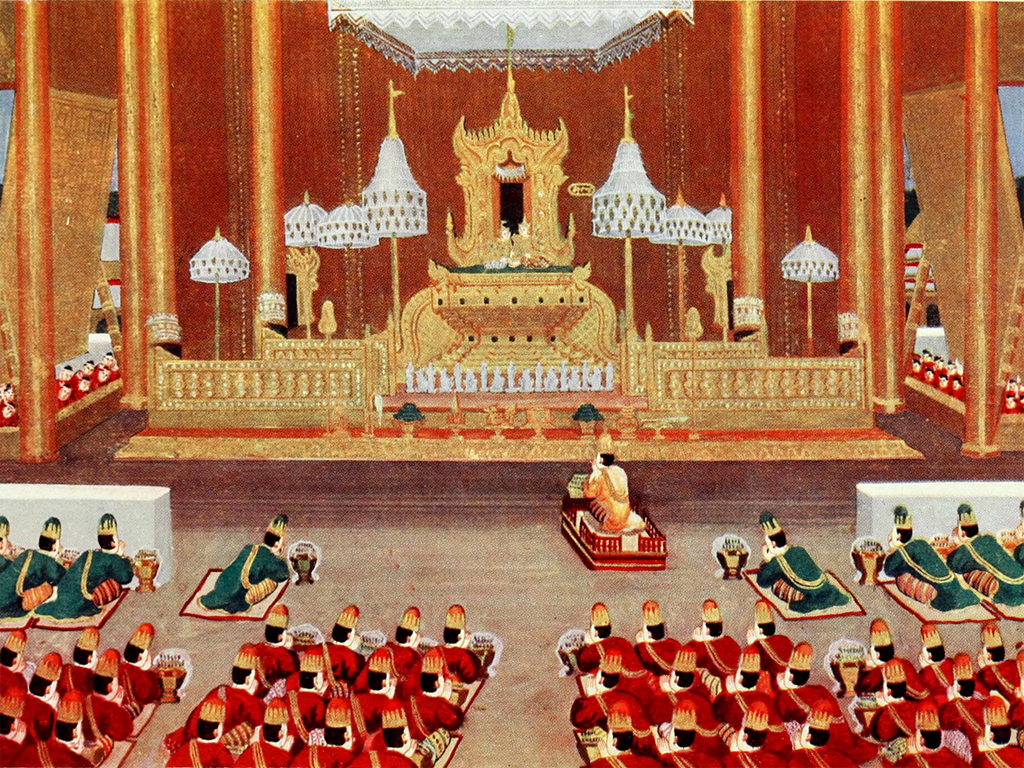
A painting depicts the King and Queen giving the royal audience

As part of the coronation, the square yuzana (12.72 square mi) around the capital was designated a sanctuary; all prisoners were released; and firewood, flowers and fruits were donated to all monks and Punna. The edicts were received by Thandawsint and were transmitted to Nagandaw (who presented matters to the King for his decision and relayed the decision to those concerned).

Seven days later, around 11:30 am, the King (dressed as Brahma) and Chief Queen (dressed as a Queen of the devaloka) gave royal audiences to ministers and generals. After that, the king and members of the royal family made an inaugural procession, circling the city moat on a gilt state barge, amid festive music and spectators.
