= Phyo, Prince of Mekkhaya =

First prince of Mekkhaya

Prince Phyo

Prince of Mekkhaya
- Reign: 1853 - 1879
- Successor: Prince Myo Tu

Prince of Malun
- Reign: 18?? – 1837
- Successor: Malun Prince
- Born: Phyo c. 1791; Amarapura
- Died: 1848 (aged 56–57); Amarapura
- Spouse: Min Shwe Yoke; Min Shwe Hmoke; Min Shwe Lote
Regnal name
- Maha Thiri Thu Dhammayaza
- House: Konbaung
- Father: King Bodawpaya
- Mother: Queen of the Northern Palace
- Religion: Theravada Buddhism

Maha Thiri Thu Dhammayaza (Burmese: မဟာသီရိသုဓမ္မရာဇာ, Pali: Mahāsīrisudhammarāja; born Phyo; c. 1791 – 1848), commonly known as the Prince of Mekkhaya (also spelt Mekkhara Prince) and Prince of Malun, was a Burmese royal prince and scholar during the Konbaung dynasty who is known as the first compiler of an English–Myanmar dictionary. He was the first and only member of the Asiatic Society of Bengal from the Burmese royal family and was nicknamed the "philosopher-prince" by English officers for his knowledge of literature and science.

Prince Phyo was called 'the first Prince of Mekkhaya' by historians, not to be confused with the second Prince of Mekkhaya, the Governor-general of Taungdwingyi Province who was born half a century later.

== Early life and education ==
Maung Phyo was born in 1791 in Amarapura Palace to King Bodawpaya and the Queen of the Northern Palace. He had a younger brother and a sister: Maung Yoe the Prince of Hlaing and Shwe Nan Myint the Princess of Kyaukse.

He received the titles of Minye Kyawswa, Thado Minhla Kyawswa and Maha Thiri Dhammayaza in 1797, 1802 and 1806 respectively. The title of Maha Thiri Thu Dhammayaza was conferred on him in 1823.

In addition to Mekkhaya (a town on the western bank of the mouth of the Zawgyi River in Kyaukse District), he was granted the appanage of Bantkyi circle, but remained known as the Mekkhaya Prince.

During the reign of King Sagaing, he received the appanage of Malun in the place of Mekkhaya and Bantkyi, therefore becoming known as the Prince of Malun, which was undone during King Tharrawaddy's reign in 1837.

== Career as a scholar ==
Suffering from paralysis from an early age, Prince Phyo focused on scholarly rather than martial prowess, studying medicine, chemistry, physics, astrology, Pāli and Sanskrit, from which languages he translated about 234 books into Burmese.

He learned the English language from a physician named Price, the Particular Baptist missionary Simon, and Rodger, a merchant who accompanied Adoniram Judson (who translated the Bible into Burmese) to Burma. Prince Phyo could speak and write English well, and was proficient in mathematics.

In the 1830s he decided to compile an Anglo–Burmese dictionary. Its hand-written manuscript was completed circa 1835 with the help of Price and later of Charles Lane. In 1841 it was printed in Calcutta and published by the library department of the British Museum; it is available at the National Library of Myanmar and the Library of Congress of the United States as of 2021.

Prince Phyo died in July 1848.

== Family ==
Prince Phyo had three wives:

- Min Shwe Yoke, the Princess of Kyannyat. She was a composer from Kyayze Yadu and received the appanages of Kyannyat, Nyaungyan and Megawady. They had two daughters: Nan Shwe Myint, the Princess of Padaung, who later became a consort of Crown Prince Sagaing and of King Tharrawaddy, and Min Shwe Kyu, the Chief Queen of King Pagan,
- Min Shwe Hmoke, the Princess of Magway. She received the appanages of Sakkapa, Magway and Laungshe.
- Min Shwe Lote, the Princess of Danubyu. She received the appanages of Tagaung and Danubyu. She was originally his brother's consort and married Prince Phyo when her first husband died.

== See also ==
- Prince Myo Tu, the second Prince of Mekkhaya
