= Min Shwe Kyu =

Queen consort of King Pagan Min of Burma

Min Shwe Kyu မင်းရွှေကျူ

Chief queen consort of Burma
- Tenure: 1846–1853
- Predecessor: Kyapin Mibaya
- Successor: Setkya Dewi
- Born: 1820; Burma
- Died: 23 July 1892 (aged 71–72); South Win Mansion, Mandalay, Burma
- Spouse: Pagan Min
Regnal name
- Thiri Tilawka Maha Yadana Dewi (သီရိတိလောကမဟာရတနာဒေဝီ)
- House: Konbaung dynasty
- Father: Prince Phyo, Prince of Mekkhaya
- Mother: Min Shwe Yoke, the Princess of Kyannyat

Thiri Tiloka Maha Ratna Devi (Burmese: သီရိတိလောကမဟာရတနာဒေဝီ, born Min Shwe Kyu (Burmese: မင်းရွှေကျူ; 1820 – 23 July 1892) was a queen consort of Burma as the wife of King Pagan Min of the Konbaung dynasty. She was crowned after Pagan Min's accession in 1846.

== Early life ==
Min Shwe Kyu was born in 1820 to Prince Phyo, Prince of Mekkhaya, a son of King Bodawpaya, and his consort Min Shwe Yoke, the Princess of Kyannyat, who was also a child of Bodawpaya. She was the eldest of three sisters. Her middle sister, Su Me Gyi, was granted the appanage of Tabe and later became a senior queen consort of King Pagan, known as Tabe Mibaya. Her youngest sister, Su Me Kya, was granted the appanage of Kyannyet and became a princess of the first rank.

== Queenship ==
In 1838, she married the Prince of Pagan. When he ascended the throne as King Pagan Min in 1846, she was crowned as Thiri Tiloka Maha Ratna Devi. She reigned as queen consort until 1853.

During her reign, she did not wield as much influence at court as her mother-in-law, Queen Dowager Kyapin Mibaya, the former consort of the late King Tharrawaddy, who continued to hold power at court.

== Later life and death ==
After the fall of the Konbaung dynasty, Min Shwe Kyu was permitted to reside in Mandalay with the status of a first-class royal. Beginning 1 January 1886, she received a political pension of Rs. 150 and a housing allowance of Rs. 60. In her final days, she cooperated with the British. Min Shwe Kyu offered refuge to Prince Maung Maung Tin, who had taken up arms against them. Owing to the queen’s negotiations, the prince was able to survive and later devoted himself to writing, research, and the preservation of historical literature, eventually becoming the author of the last royal chronicle of Burma, the Konbaung Set Yazawin.

She died on 23 July 1892 at the age of 72 at the South Win Mansion, located west of Mingalar Market in Mandalay.

== See also ==
- Konbaung dynasty
- Pagan Min
- Bodawpaya
