= Amarapura Palace =

Coordinates: 21.8935°N 96.0507°E

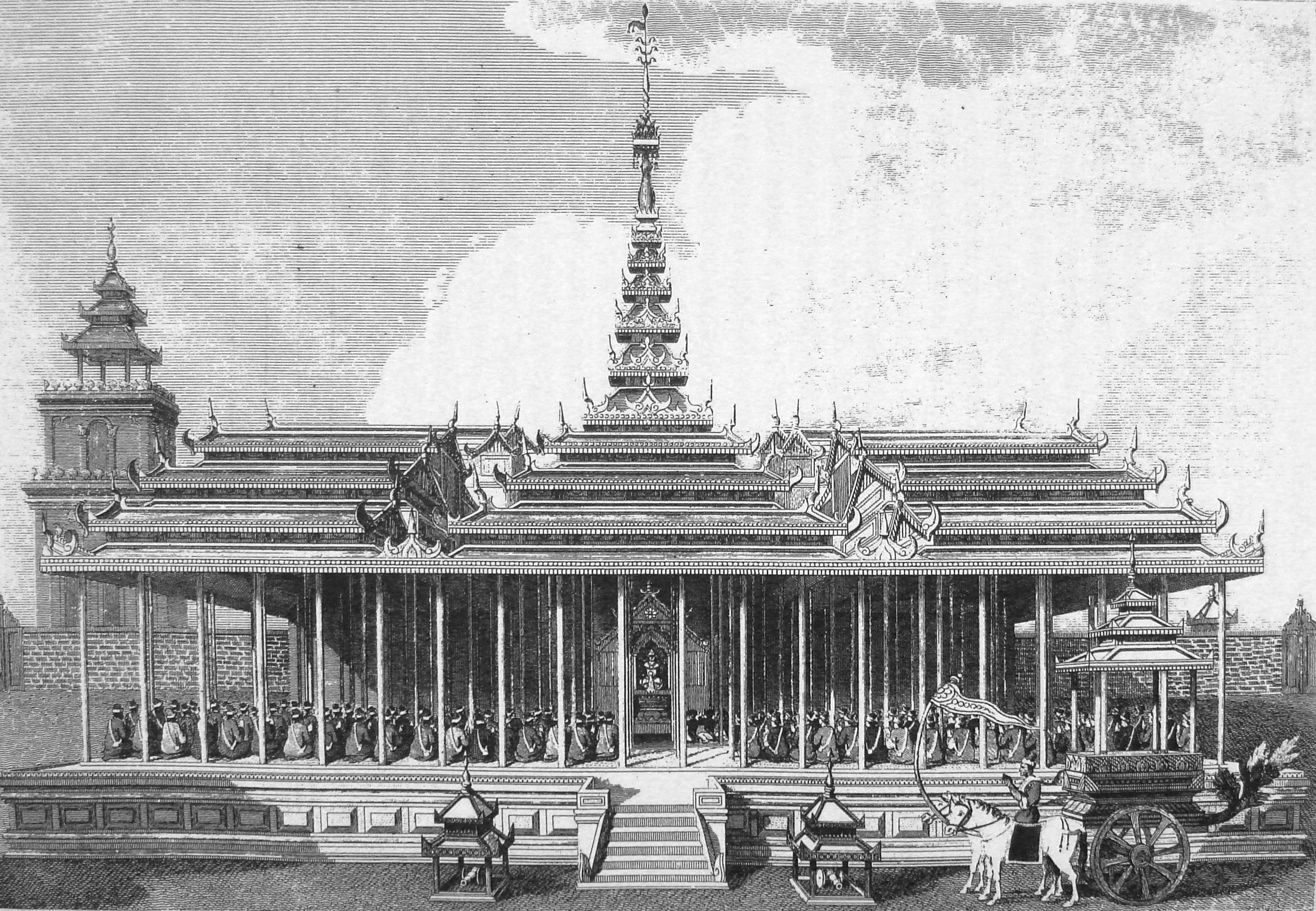
Amarapura Palace in 1795

Amarapura Palace was a royal palace in the old capital of Amarapura in Burma. The palace was constructed in the late 18th/early 19th century and later superseded by Mandalay Palace. Little of the original palace survives today.

Amarapura Palace was the royal residence of the Konbaung dynasty. Established by King Bodawpaya in the late 18th century, it served as the seat of the Burmese monarchy before the royal court was transferred to Mandalay under King Mindon in 1857.

== History ==
=== Establishment and reconstruction ===
After King Bodawpaya of the Konbaung Dynasty ascended the throne in 1782, he founded the royal capitol of Amarapura in 1783 and established the palace there. Amarapura Palace served as the royal residence and the centre of the Konbaung administration during Bodawpaya's reign.

On 13 March 1810, a major fire destroyed Amarapura Palace. Reconstruction began shortly afterwards, with timber and other building materials gathered for the rebuilding of the royal complex. Copper tiles were manufactured for the palace roofs, while lead tiles were used to cover passages between its apartments. An account of the palace's construction expenses was recorded in October 1811.

The royal court subsequently moved to Ava in 1821 under Bodawpaya's grandson, King Bagyidaw, before returning to Amarapura in 1842 under King Tharrawaddy due to the occurrence of the 1839 Ava earthquake.

=== Architecture ===
The British visitor Colesworthy Grant wrote in 1855 that the audience hall was built by King Tharrawaddy about the year 1838. The grounds were believed to cover a space of about a quarter of a square mile and an elevated brick terrace formed the lower part. The superstructure was made out of wood and gilded. The length of the terrace was about 260 feet (79 m).

=== Transfer to Mandalay ===
In January 1857, Mindon seized power from his brother King Pagan. He ordered the palace to be moved from Amarapura to Mandalay, which would become the new royal capitol of Burma.

Many of the teak buildings from Amarapura Palace were dismantled and transported to the new capital. The buildings, which featured elaborate gilt carvings, were reassembled and refurbished with additional ornamentation, paint and gilding. The parts and materials of the palace eventually contributed to the erection of Mandalay Palace.

Today the tombs of King Bodawpaya and King Bagyidaw remain, as well as parts of the old moat.

== Gallery ==
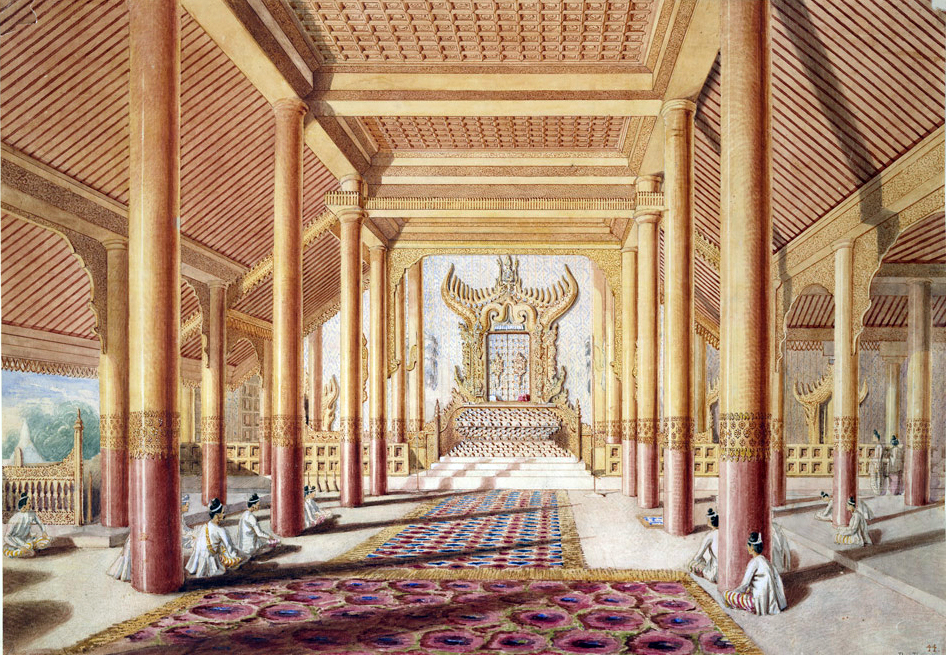
Lion throne, Amarapura Palace in 1855

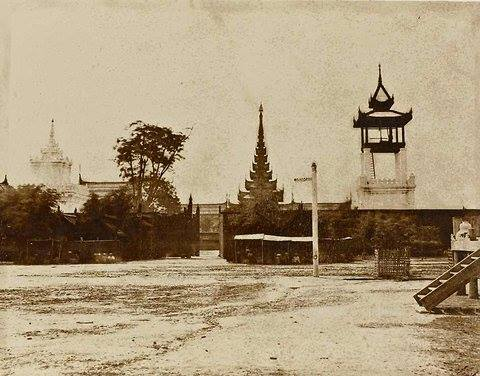
Amarapura Palace in November 1855 by the English photographer Linnaeus Tripe

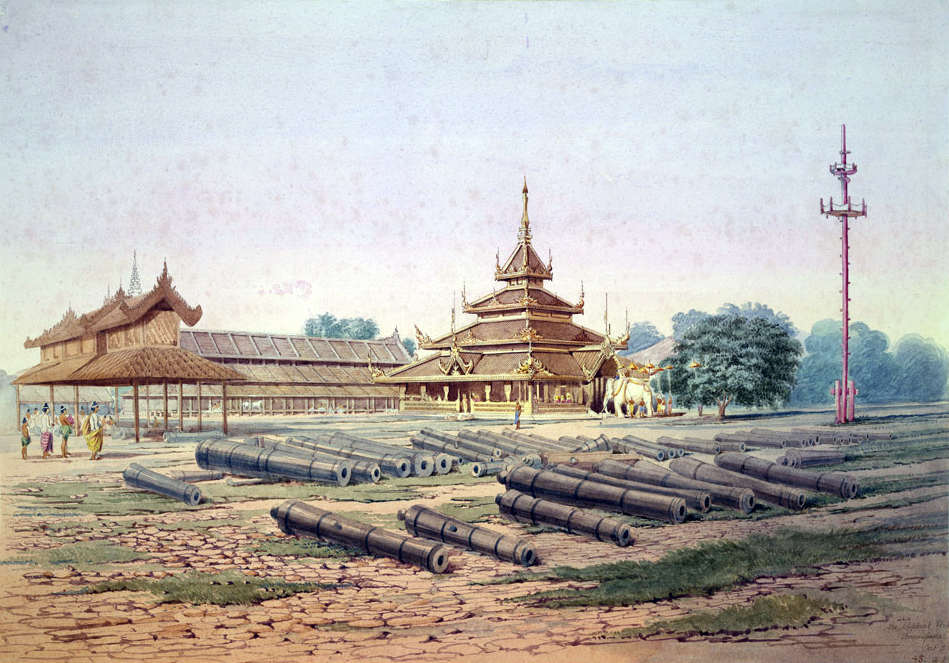
The White Elephant Palace, within Royal Palace grounds in 1855 painted by Colesworthy Grant

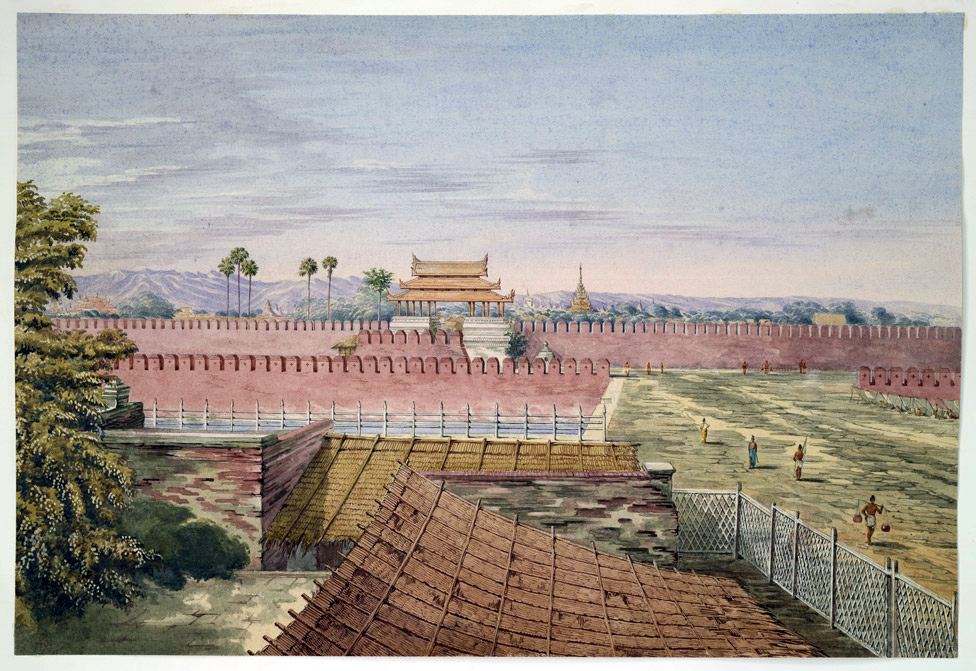
West Gate and part of City Wall in 1855

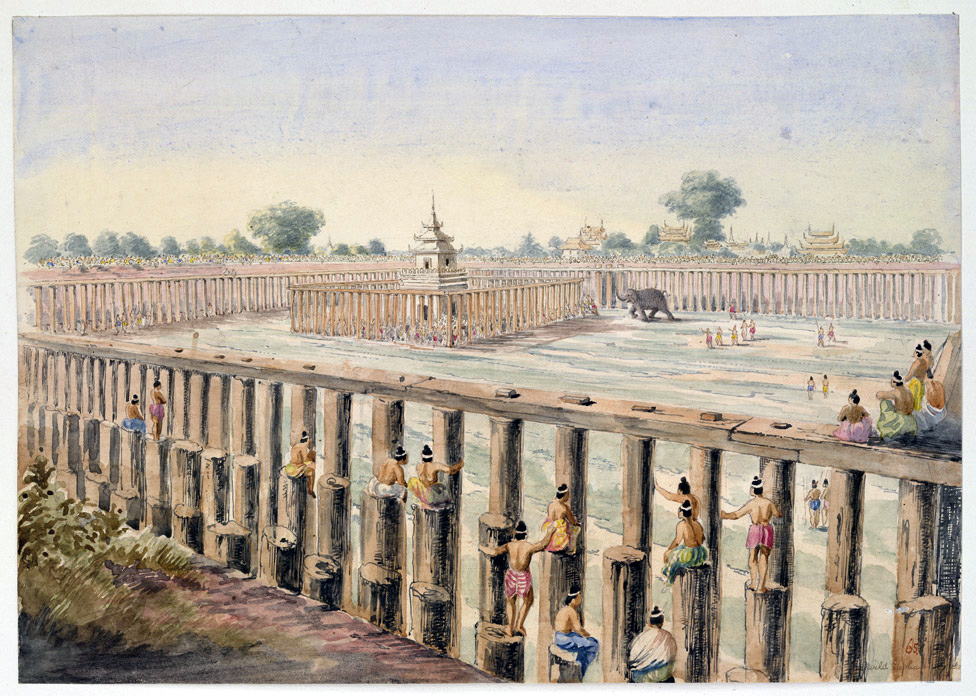
A large wooden arena at Amarapura in 1855

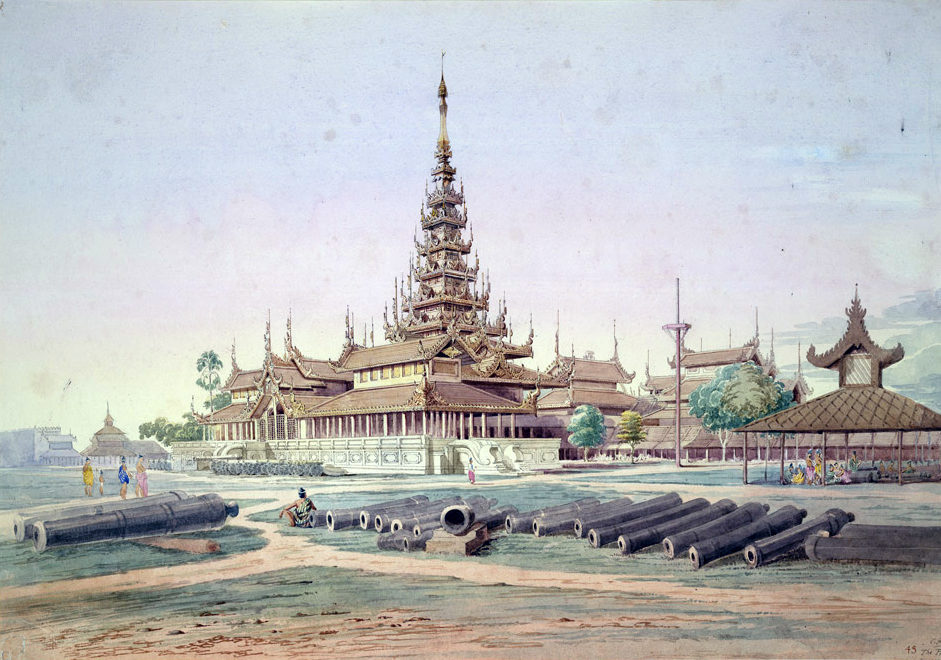
A watercolour of the king's palace in Amarapura, Burma, 1855
