= Mindon Min =

King of Burma from 1853 to 1878

Mindon Min မင်းတုန်းမင်း
- King of Konbaung, Prince of Mindon, Mindon King
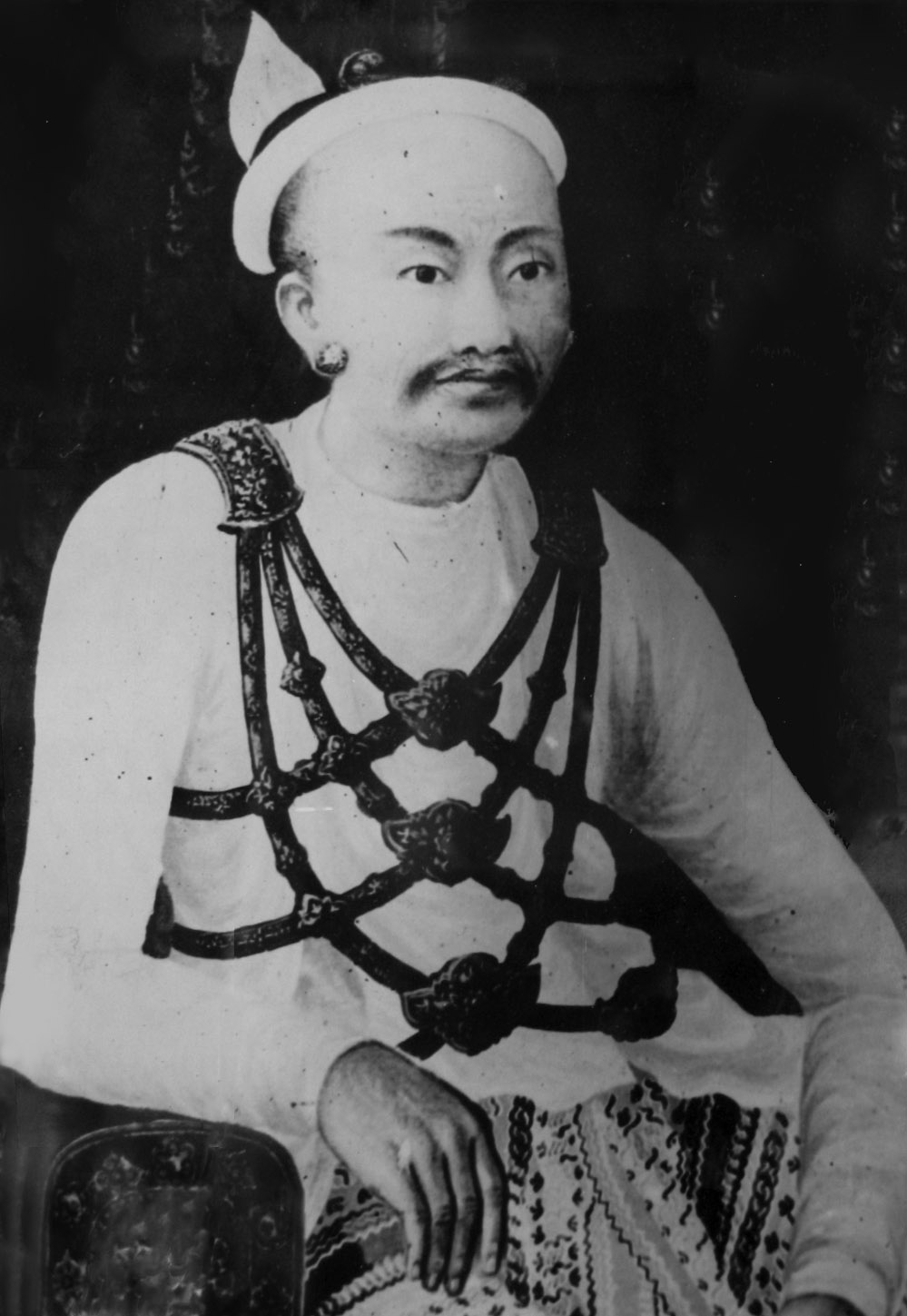
- Photograph of Mindon on display at Mandalay Palace, c. 1860s–70s

King of Burma
- Tenure: 18 February 1853 – 1 October 1878
- Coronation: 6 July 1854
- Predecessor: Pagan
- Successor: Thibaw
- Born: Maung Lwin; 8 July 1808; Inwa, Konbaung Kingdom
- Died: 1 October 1878 (aged 70); Mandalay, Konbaung Kingdom
- Burial: Mandalay Palace
- Consort: Setkya Dewi
- Issue Detail: Thibaw and Supayalat
Regnal name
- Siri Pavaravijaya Nantayasapaṇḍita Tribhavanāditya Mahādhammarājadhirāja (သီရိပဝရဝိဇယာနန္တယသပဏ္ဍိတ တြိဘဝနအာဒိတျာ မဟာဓမ္မရာဇာဓိရာဇာ)
- House: Konbaung
- Father: Tharrawaddy
- Mother: Chandra Mata Mahay, Queen of the South Royal Chamber
- Religion: Theravada Buddhism

Mindon Min (Burmese: မင်းတုန်းမင်း, pronounced [mɪ́ɰ̃dóʊɰ̃ mɪ́ɰ̃]; 1808 – 1878), (Note: Some sources claim he was born in 1814.) born Maung Lwin, was the penultimate king of Burma (Myanmar) from 1853 to 1878. He was one of the most popular and revered kings of Burma because of his role in the Fifth Buddhist Council. Under his half brother King Pagan, the Second Anglo-Burmese War in 1852 ended with the annexation of Lower Burma by the British Empire. Mindon and his younger brother Kanaung overthrew their half brother King Pagan. He spent most of his reign trying to defend the upper part of his country from British encroachments, and to modernize his kingdom.

== Early life ==
Mindon was born Maung Lwin in 1808, a son of Tharrawaddy Min and Chandra Mata Mahay, Queen of the south Royal Chamber. He studied at the Maha Zawtika monastic college in Amarapura until the age of 23, and held deep respect for religion and religious scholarship throughout his life.

Mindon grew up in the shadow of British control – by 1853, the year of his coronation, Burma had gone through radical changes. The British annexations of Arakan, the Himalayan kingdoms of the north of India, and the Irrawaddy Delta and their blockade of Burma caused a tightening of the food supply, the loss of trade through ports, an erosion of Burma as an imperial power, and the incorporation of Burma into the world market as a result. There was an atmosphere of reform due to translated works and better knowledge about the outside world. At the same time, migrations of people from the national core to Lower Burma, controlled by the British, were sapping Burma of its labor and taxes.

== Taking the throne ==
Mindon took the throne following a bloody conflict of succession with his half-brother, Pagan Min. Under Pagan, Mindon was the president of the Council of State, and was presiding as the Second Anglo-Burmese War began. He was against the continuation of the war and favored an unpopular program of appeasement. Mindon's most loyal ally at this time was his brother Kanaung Mintha.

In a November 1852 plot to implicate Mindon and Kanaung in a series of robberies by the Myowun of Amarapura, Mindon, Kanaung, and their immediate family and retainers fled to Shwebo, the seat of their ancestor, King Alaungpaya. The war with the British had thus become a two-front war, and the court of Pagan quickly collapsed, with the Myozas of Kyaukmaw and Yenangyaung allowing Mindon and Kanaung to walk into the capital, Ava, unopposed. Mindon thus ascended the throne with the regnal name of Thiri Thudhamma Tilawka Pawara Maha Dhamma Razadiraza on 18 February 1853.

== Early reign ==
The early reign of Mindon was characterized by joint rule with Kanaung, who was allowed a large court and was designated Mindon's heir, as well as given control over matters of technology, modernization, and the arts. Behind Mindon's throne too was his chief queen and his four chief advisors – the myozas of Magwe, Thalun, Myedaung, and Pahkangyi, the latter being Mindon's former tutor who was given the position as Mindon ascended to the throne. This new government was given oaths of allegiance by the Shan princes, as well as gifts from the Chinese.

Immediately following his taking of the throne, Mindon went into a ceasefire with the British, coming into effect on 30 June 1853. Although hostilities with the British had ended, Mindon still faced considerable military difficulties, namely a revolt at Kanpyin and an attack from the neighboring Kingdom of Siam. In late 1853, Mindon won a pyrrhic victory against the Siamese, but when they returned again, he sent 3,000 cavalry supported by artillery, which finally stopped the Siamese encroachment upon Burmese land.

== Achievements ==
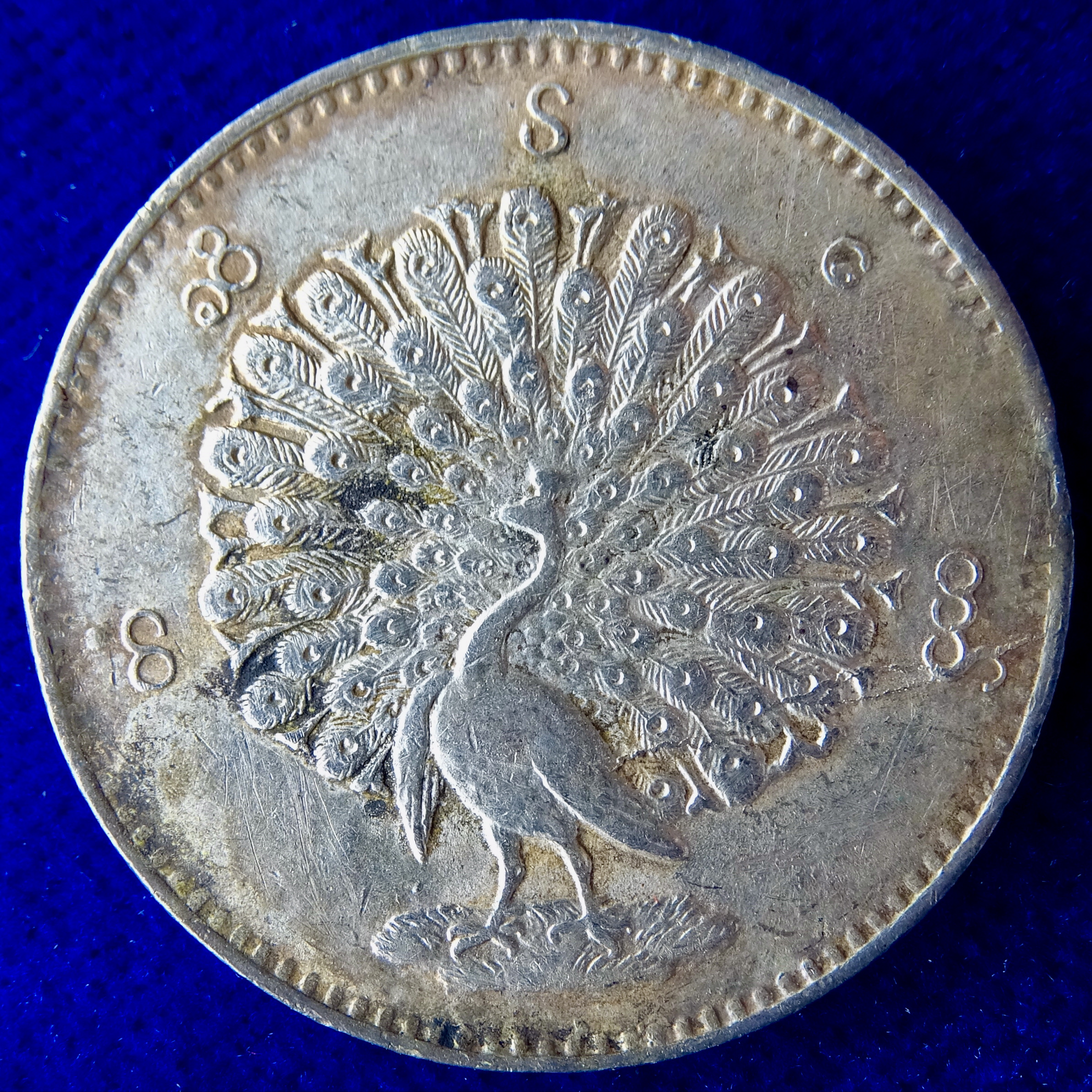
Obverse of the first machine struck 1 Kyat (Rupee) 1214 (1853 AD), a silver coin.

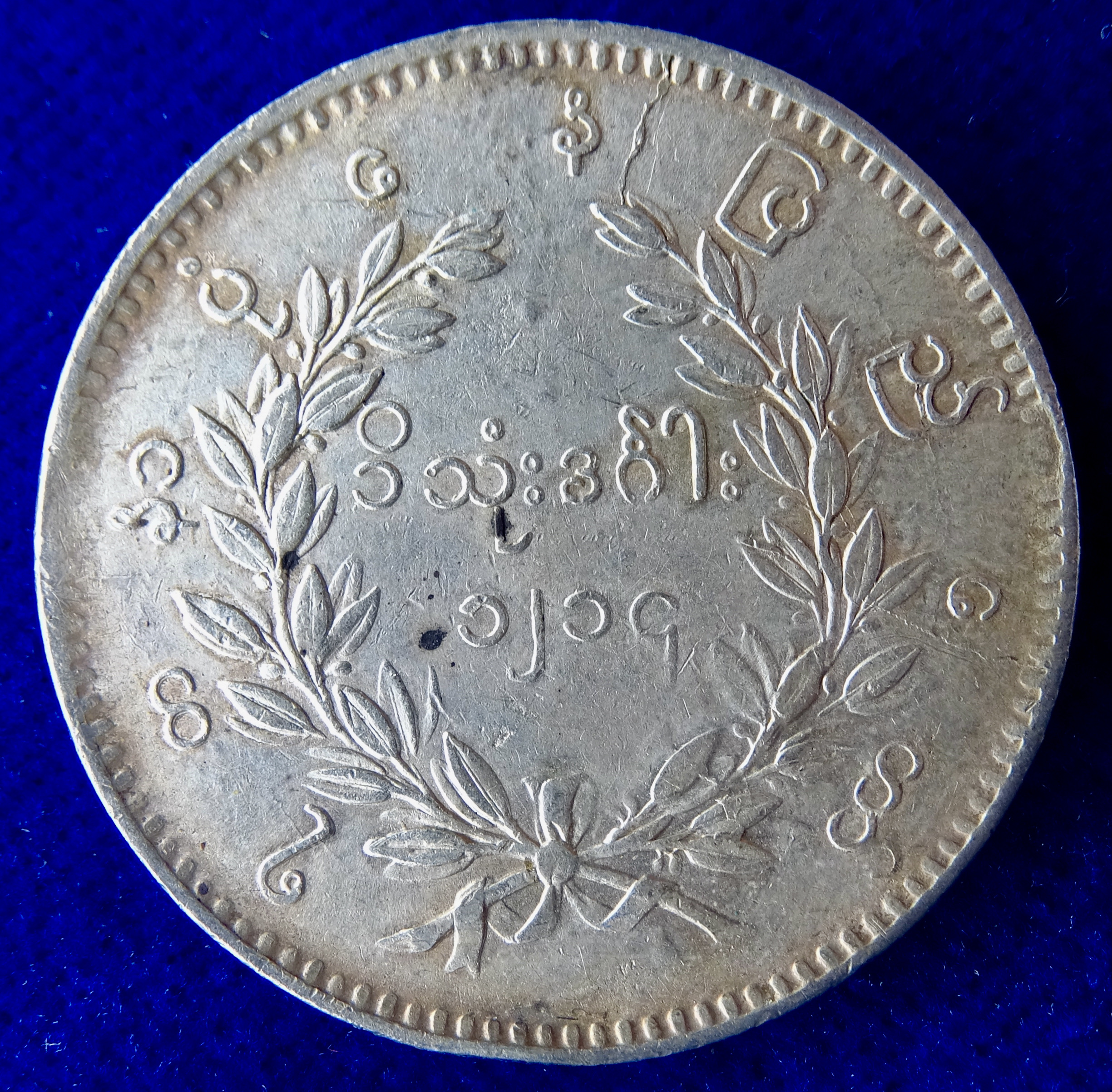
Reverse of the 1 Kyat

King Mindon founded the last royal capital of Burma, Mandalay, in 1857. His younger brother Kanaung proved to be a great administrator and modernizer. During Mindon's reign, scholars were sent to France, Italy, the United States, and Great Britain, in order to learn about the tremendous progress achieved by the Industrial Revolution.

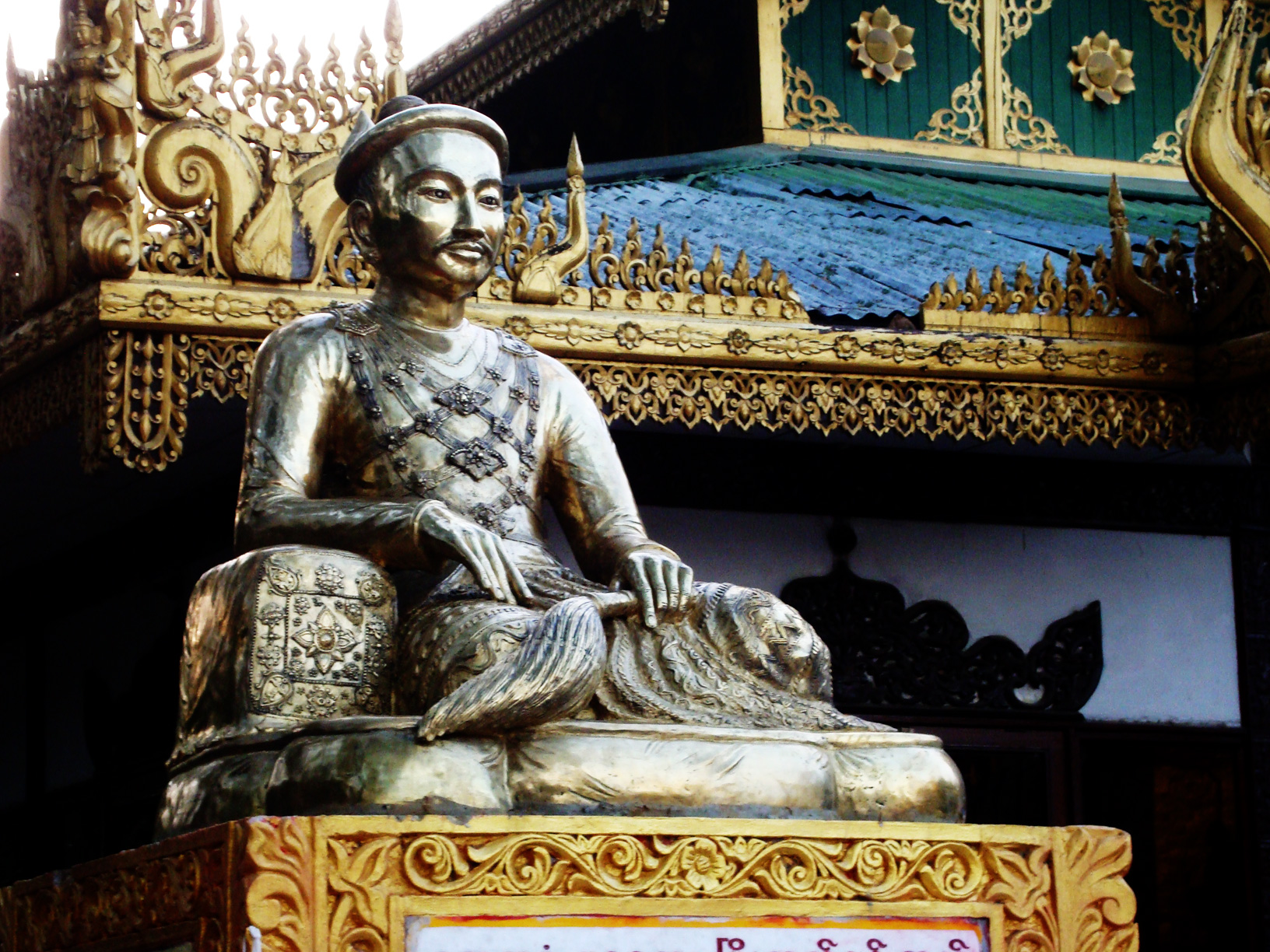
Statue of King Mindon at Mandalay

During Mindon's reign, the following reforms were undertaken: centralization of the kingdom's internal administration, introduction of a salary system for the bureaucracy (to dampen the authority and income of bureaucrats), fixed judicial fees, comprehensive penal laws, reorganization of the financial system, removal of trade barriers including custom duties, reform of the thathameda taxes (to increase direct taxation), and modernization of the kingdom's army and introduction of new police forces.

A Burmese manuscript (Or 13681) held by the British Library depicts "seven scenes of King Mindon's donations at various places during the first four years of his reign (1853–57)", including a monastery, rest houses, and gifts for monks.

Mindon introduced the first machine-struck coins to Burma, and in 1871 also held the Fifth Buddhist council in Mandalay. He had already created the world's largest book in 1868, the Tipitaka, 729 pages of the Buddhist Pali Canon inscribed in marble and each stone slab housed in a small stupa at the Kuthodaw Pagoda at the foot of Mandalay Hill.

In 1871 Mindon also donated a new hti ('umbrella' or crown gilded and encrusted with precious diamonds and other gems) to the 105-metre-tall (344 ft) Shwedagon Pagoda, which is located in then British held Yangon, although he was not allowed to visit this most famous and venerated pagoda in the country.

On 15 August 1873, Mindon also enacted the Seventeen Articles, one of Southeast Asia's first indigenous press freedom laws.

In 1875, during a royal consecration ceremony, Mindon took on the title Siripavaravijayanantayasa Paṇḍita Tribhavanadityadhipati Mahadhammarajadhiraja.

With the opening of the Suez Canal, Mindon assembled a flotilla of steamers to facilitate trade with the British.

His brother Kanaung is still remembered by the Burmese as an avid modernizer, who would go to the factories early on cold winter mornings with a blanket wrapped around him, just to talk to the mechanics about how the machines ran. He was in charge of the Royal Army, as was customarily required of Burmese crown princes, and he imported and manufactured guns, cannons and shells.

== Religious stance ==
Mindon was known for his Buddhist devotion and religious tolerance. He helped build monasteries and missionary schools for Buddhism. The first non-Sangha-run schools in Burma were run by Christians, and Mindon himself sent his son, Thibaw Min, to study in a missionary school.

Mindon also fulfilled his responsibility as a pious Buddhist. He reasserted the king's role of being the protector of Buddha Sasana, convened the Fifth Buddhist council in 1871, and supported the work of scholar-monks and their returning to Lower Burma to teach.

== Palace rebellion ==
In 1866 two of Mindon's sons, Prince Myingun and Prince Myingundaing attempted a palace coup. Myingun claimed that the Crown Prince Kanaung was oppressive, and Kanaung was murdered during the revolt. Mindon escaped alive and the coup was crushed when Myingun fled in a steamer to British Burma. Rumours of British involvement are unsubstantiated, and no evidence exists showing their support for the revolt.

While Mindon was escaping the palace, he ran into a would-be assassin, Maung Paik Gyi, who lost his nerve and grovelled in front of the king. Mindon commanded him to carry him from the palace, which he promptly did.

== Succession crisis ==
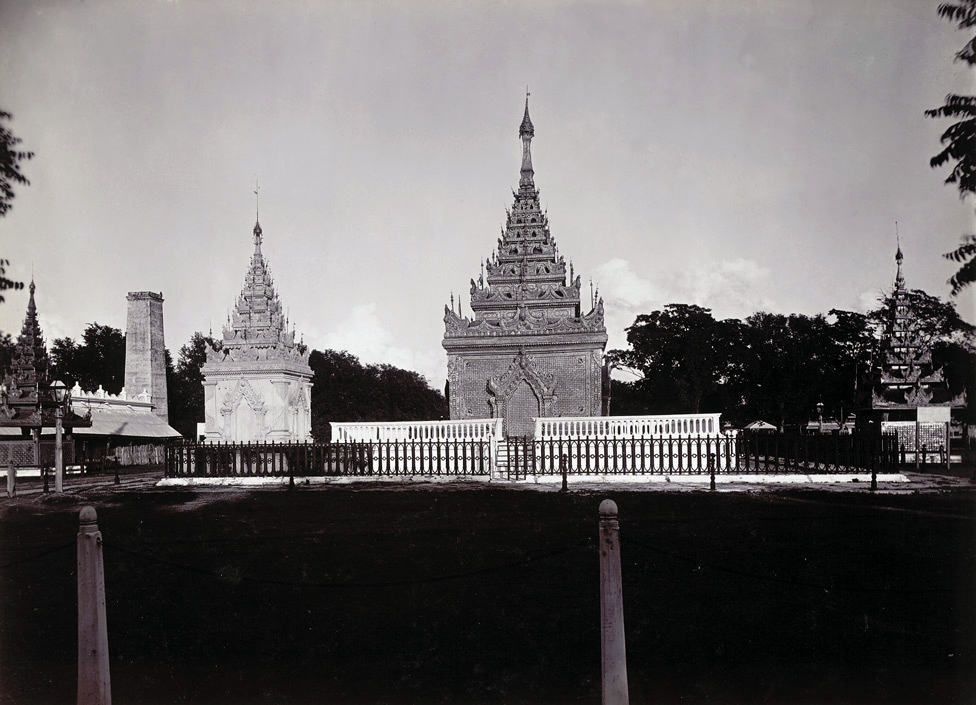
King Mindon's tomb in Mandalay in 1903.

The rebellion caused Mindon great reluctance in naming a successor to Kanaung for fear of civil war.

One of his queens, Hsinbyumashin, dominated the last days of King Mindon. It was an edict by Hsinbyumashin that ordered almost all possible heirs to the throne be killed, so that her daughter Supayalat and son-in-law Thibaw would become queen and king. Close royals of all ages and both genders were mercilessly executed, after being tricked that the dying king wanted to bid them farewell.

Thibaw, Mindon's son from a lesser queen, succeeded him after his death in 1878. King Thibaw was defeated by the British in the Third Anglo-Burmese War in November 1885 resulting in total annexation of Burma.

=== Family ===
| Consort | Children | Remarks |
|---|---|---|
| Nanmadaw Mibaya | – | |
| Alenandaw Mibaya | Supayagyi Princess; Supayalat Princess; Supayagale Princess; Panche Prince; Shwekodawgyi Princess; Shwekodawgale Princess | |
| Myauknandaw Mibaya | – | |
| First Anauknandaw Mibaya | Unnamed son; Unnamed daughter | |
| Second Anauknandaw Mibaya | – | |
| Taungsaungdaw Mibaya | Sagu Prince; Mohnyin Prince; Mohnyin Princess | |
| First Myauksaungdaw Mibaya | Malon Prince; Pyinzi Prince; Wuntho Prince | |
| Second Myauksaungdaw Mibaya | Kanni Princess; Ngape Princess; Mekkaya Prince; Kyannyat Princess; Sinyin Princess | |
| First Taungshweye Mibaya | Myingun Prince; Myinkhondaing Prince | |
| Second Taungshweye Mibaya | Tagaung Princess; Kyundaung Princess | |
| Second Myaukshweye Mibaya | Nyaungyan Prince; Nyaungok Prince; Kyauksauk Princess | |
| Seindon Mibaya | – | |
| Magway Mibaya | Mingin Princess; Pyinzi Princess | |
| Laungshe Mibaya | Maingkaing Princess; Pakhangyi Princess; Thibaw Prince; Meiktila Princess | |
| Zabwedaung Mibaya | Pin Princess; Momeik Princess | |
| Khonnaywa Mibaya | Thonze Prince; Pinle Prince; Kothani Prince; Panya Prince; Myingon Princess; Taungtha Princess; Padaing Princess; Myogyi Princess; Minlat Princess | |
| Limban Mibaya | Salin Princess; Chebin Prince; Yanaung Prince | |
| Thatpun Mibaya | Shwegu Prince; Mohlaing Prince; Taungnyo Prince | |
| Yapwe Mibaya | Maington Prince | |
| Letpansin Mibaya | Yindaw Princess; Katha Princess; Myinsaing Prince | |
| Saywa Mibaya | Kyaukhnyat Princess | |
| Kokkotha Mibaya | Katha Prince | |
| Thanatsin Mibaya | Kawlin Prince | |
| Myansin Mibaya | – | |
| Pwegan Mibaya | Sawhla Princess; Yinkhe Princess | |
| Mone Mibaya | Hingan Princess | |
| Hlaingkyun Mibaya | Taungdwingyaung Princess | |
| Legya Mibaya | Unnamed prince | |
| Tanaungdaing Mibaya | – | |
| Tharazein Mibaya | Naungmon Princess; Taingda Princess (born 1865; died 1952); Mainglon Princess | |
| Thibaw Mibaya | – | |
| Magyibinsauk Mibaya | Maingnaung Princess | |
| Htihlaing Mibaya | Thagaya Prince | |
| Ywathit Mibaya | – | |
| Ngabinsin Mibaya | – | |
| Nanon Mibaya | – | |
| Kyauktalon Mibaya | Myaunghla Princess | |
| Migaungdet Mibaya | – | |
| Ywapale Mibaya | Htilin Prince | |
| Kyaymyin Mibaya | Pyinmana Prince | |
| Theinni Mibaya | Unnamed son; Unnamed daughter; Unnamed daughter | |
| Kyaukye Mibaya | | |
| Sinde Mibaya | | |
| Kyaingtaung Mibaya | | |

== See also ==
- Coronation of Mindon Min
- Death and funeral of Mindon Min
- Htayanka Princess

== Bibliography ==
- Becker, Judith (2015). European Missions in Contact Zones: Transformation Through Interaction in a (post-)colonial World. Vandenhoeck & Ruprecht. ISBN 978-3-525-10141-4.
- Candier, Aurore (December 2011). "Conjuncture and Reform in the Late Konbaung Period". Journal of Burma Studies 15 (2).
- Charney, Michael W. (2006). Powerful Learning: Buddhist Literati and the Throne in Burma's Last Dynasty, 1752–1885. Ann Arbor: University of Michigan.
- Dhammasami, Khammai (2018). Buddhism, Education and Politics in Burma and Thailand: From the Seventeenth Century to the Present. Bloomsbury Publishing. ISBN 978-1-350-05426-4.
- Hall, D.G.E. (1960). Burma (3rd ed.). Hutchinson University Library. ISBN 978-1406735031.
- Htin Aung, Maung (1967). A History of Burma. New York and London: Cambridge University Press.
- Maung Maung Tin, U (1905). Konbaung Hset Maha Yazawin (in Burmese). Vol. 1–3 (2004 ed.). Yangon: Department of Universities History Research, University of Yangon.
- Myint-U, Thant (2001). The Making of Modern Burma. Cambridge University Press. ISBN 978-0-521-79914-0.
- Myint-U, Thant (2006). The River of Lost Footsteps – Histories of Burma. Farrar, Straus and Giroux. ISBN 978-0-374-16342-6.
- Ooi, Keat Gin (2004). Southeast Asia: A Historical Encyclopedia, from Angkor Wat to East Timor. ABC-CLIO. ISBN 978-1-57607-770-2.
- Phayre, Lt. Gen. Sir Arthur P. (1883). History of Burma (1967 ed.). London: Susil Gupta.
- Roy, Kaushik (2020). Frontiers, Insurgencies and Counter-Insurgencies in South Asia. Taylor & Francis. ISBN 978-1-00-008423-8.
- Saler, Michael (2014). The Fin-de-Siècle World. Routledge. ISBN 978-1-317-60481-5.
- Taylor, Robert H. (2009). The State in Myanmar. NUS Press. ISBN 978-9971-69-466-1.

Mindon Min Konbaung dynasty Born: 8 July 1808 Died: 1 October 1878
Regnal titles
| Preceded by Pagan | King of Burma; 18 February 1853 – 1 October 1878 | Succeeded by Thibaw |
Royal titles
| Preceded by | Prince of Mindon | Succeeded by |
