= Myo Tu, Prince of Mekkhaya =

Second prince of Mekkhaya

Prince Myo Tu

Prince of Mekkhaya
- Reign: 1853 - 1879
- Predecessor: Prince Phyo
- Successor: disestablished

Viceroy to Taungdwingyi Province
- Reign: 1878
- Born: Myo Tu c. 1847; Ava
- Died: 1879 (aged 31–32); Mandalay Palace
- Spouse: Pin Princess and six concubines
Regnal name
- Thiri Maha Thu Dhammayaza
- House: Konbaung
- Father: King Mindon
- Mother: Nanda Dewi
- Religion: Theravada Buddhism

Thiri Maha Thu Dhammayaza (Burmese: သီရိမဟာသုဓမ္မရာဇာ, Pali: Sīrimahāsudhammarājā; born Myo Tu; c. 1847 – 1879), commonly known as the Prince of Mekkhaya, was a prince of the first rank of the late Konbaung dynasty in 19th-century Burma. He was a senior son of King Mindon and was the Viceroy to Taungdwingyi Province. He was considered one of the four most skilled sons of King Mindon, alongside the princes of Thonze, Nyaungyan and Myingun.

He was called 'the second Prince of Mekkhaya' by historians, not to be confused with the first Prince of Mekkhaya who compiled the first English–Myanmar dictionary.

== Early life and career ==
Maung Myo Tu, the third of six siblings, was born on 14 July 1847 to the future King Mindon and his consort Nanda Dewi, the first Queen of the Northern Gilded Chamber (later the second Queen of the Northern Apartment). After his father ascended the throne, he received the title of Thado Minhtin and was granted the appanage of Mekkhaya (a town on the western bank of the mouth of the Zawgyi River in Kyaukse District) on 26 August 1853. At that point he became known as the Prince (or Myoza) of Mekkhaya (an equivalent position to a duke).

He and five other princes were novitiated on 1 July 1860.

On 15 November 1863, King Mindon married his son to the Pin Princess, but the marriage was not consummated; this led to dissatisfaction on her part and a later divorce. The Prince of Mekkhaya had six concubines at the time of his marriage: Maiseit Khin Lay (Khin Nan Yin), Malun Khin Lay (Khin Myo Nwe), Tayoketan Khin Lay, Khin Thit, Khin Mi Mi and Khin Khin, the last being his favourite.

He led the defense services in their successful suppression of the Myingun Myinkhondaing rebellion. King Mindon praised his actions by saying, "The hti and the throne are yours, my son," leading to widespread expectations that he would be the future crown prince. This fell through in 1874 when Amyint administrator Maung Gyi attended on him, breaking the king's rule against relationships between the adult princes and government employees.

== Later life and death ==
In 1872 he was appointed as an administrator of over 50 industrial factories, including the Royal Mint, succeeding Crown Prince Kanaung.

When King Mindon fell ill in 1878, all potential heirs to the throne were seized and thrown into prison by Hsinbyumashin, who dominated the king's last days. The king was informed of the situation within a week; the Prince of Mekkhaya was then released and appointed Viceroy to Taungdwingyi Province, but he was arrested again on the following day.

He was executed on 17 February 1879 as part of the royal massacre.

== See also ==
- Prince Phyo, the first Prince of Mekkhaya

== Bibliography ==
- Maung Maung Tin, U (October 2004). Konbaung Set Yazawin (Chronicle of Konbaung Dynasty) (in Burmese) (4th ed.). Yangon: Department of Universities History Research, University of Yangon.
- Khin Khin Lay, Dagon (December 2003). The Beginning and the Ending of Yadanabon (ရတနာပုံ၏ နိဒါန်းနှင့် နိဂုံး) (in Burmese). တော်ဝင်မြို့မ စာအုပ်တိုက်.
- Sein Tin, Tekkatho (June 2005). King Thibaw and Supayalat (သီပေါဘုရင်နှင့် စုဖုရားလတ်) (in Burmese) (1st ed.). အားမာန်သစ်စာပေ.
- Maung Than Swe (Dawei) (1999). Konbaung Shindan (Konbaung Explanations).
