= Me Bayat =

Me Bayat (Burmese: မယ်ဘယက်) was a female warrior who emerged during the late Konbaung dynasty. She was renowned for her skills in horseback riding and swordsmanship.

== Life ==
During the reign of King Bagyidaw, Me Bayat served as a military officer. According to the Amarapura Chronicle, she famously defeated Me Hkaloke—the daughter-in-law of Queen Nanmadaw Me Nu's lady-in-waiting—in a horseback duel near the northern gate of Amarapura. In recognition of her valor, she was granted the appanage of a small territory, known today as Me Bayat Hill, located northeast of Taungthaman Lake.

Her name reappeared in the 1866 royal military records during the reign of King Mindon—exactly 40 years after she had served as an officer in 1826 under King Bagyidaw. This suggests that she either lived a long life or that the name may refer to two different individuals.

In 1866, King Mindon faced several uprisings, including the Myingun-Myinkhondaing rebellion and the Padein Prince rebellion. Amid this turmoil, a 40-year-old widow named Mi Net Gyi—the wife of a former mayor of Amarapura—also took up arms. Mi Net Gyi harbored deep resentment toward King Mindon, stemming from injustices inflicted on her husband during the 1853 rebellion led by Mindon and his brother, Prince Kanaung, against King Pagan.

In battle, she led her troops with her hair loose, riding at the front of her forces. King Mindon's soldiers, reluctant to fight a woman, often broke ranks and retreated in confusion. Upon hearing of this, King Mindon summoned Me Bayat—a warrior of comparable skill—to confront Mi Net Gyi. Under Me Bayat's command, royal troops launched a fierce offensive, eventually defeating Mi Nget Gyi's forces.

Whether the Me Bayat who served under King Bagyidaw in the 1820s and the one active during King Mindon's reign in the 1860s were the same person remains uncertain. Given the 40-year gap, they were likely two different women, as the former would have been in her sixties—an improbable age for active combat leadership.

== Legacy ==
After independence, Me Bayat was portrayed as a national heroine in films and stage plays, with actresses such as Khin Yu May and Shan Shwe Tin taking on the role.

Today, a pagoda dedicated to Me Bayat stands to the west of the road leading to Yadanabon University. In the past, a small wooden bridge bearing her name existed near the path to Kyauktawgyi Pagoda, but it has since disappeared due to urban development and the repurposing of its materials by locals.
