= Burmese–Siamese War (1849–1855) =

Military expeditions

Burmese–Siamese War (1849–1854)
- Part of the Burmese–Siamese wars
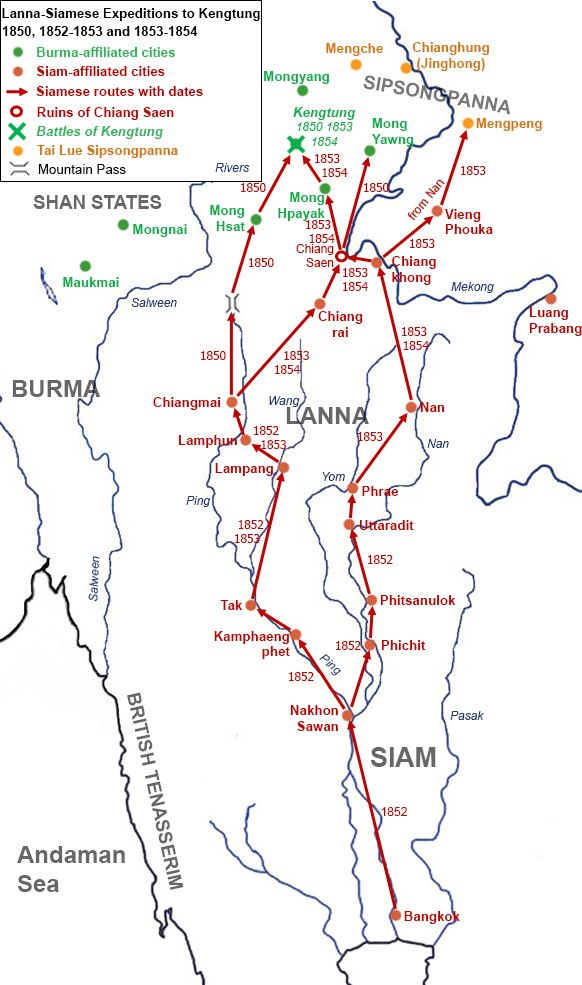
- Lanna-Siamese Expeditions to Kengtung in 1850, 1852–1853 and 1853–1854; Green represents Shan States under Burmese suzerainty including Kengtung. Red represents Lanna-Siam.
Date	February 1850 – mid 1854
Location	Kengtung, Trans-Salween region
Result	Kengtung-Konbaung victory

Belligerents
Konbaung dynasty (Burma); Kengtung State (under Burmese suzerainty)	Rattanakosin Kingdom (Siam); Kingdom of Chiang Mai (tributary to Siam); Princedom of Nan (tributary to Siam)

Commanders and leaders
Pagan Min (Until 1853); Mindon Min (After 1853); Maha Khanan of Kengtung; Maha Nawrahta	King Rama III; King Mongkut; Prince Vongsathirat Sanid; Chao Phraya Yommaraj Nuch; Mahotaraprathet -Chaophraya Mongkol Vorayot of Nan

Units involved
Kengtung Garrison	Royal Siamese Army

Strength
3,000+	First Invasion : 7,500 Second Invasion : 10,000

Casualties and losses
Unknown	Unknown

The Burmese–Siamese War of 1849–1855 or Siamese Invasions of Kengtung or Kengtung Wars were military expeditions of the Siamese Rattanakosin Kingdom against the Tai Khün State of Kengtung, which had been under Burmese suzerainty under the Konbaung dynasty. The dynastic struggles in Tai Lue State of Chiang Hung or Sipsongpanna prompted Siam, in cooperation with the Kingdom of Lanna (Northern Thailand), to invade Kengtung in order to gain access to Chiang Hung. In the First Invasion in 1850, the Siamese court had ordered the Lanna Lord of Chiang Mai to organize the offensives against Kengtung. Lanna troops failed to conquer Kengtung. Two other expeditions occurred in 1852 and 1853 as Bangkok commanded its troops to directly participate in the invasions. Both expeditions also failed because of internal issues and geographical unfamiliarity. The State of Kengtung under the leadership of Saopha Maha Khanan (Maha Hkanan), with limited assistance from mainland Burma who had been embroiling in the Second Anglo-Burmese War, managed to resist Siamese-Lanna invasions three times.

== Prelude to conflict ==
=== History of Kengtung ===
Kengtung was founded as a city by King Mangrai of Ngoenyang in 1253 and later became part of the Tai Yuan Kingdom of Lanna, which encompasses modern Northern Thailand. In 1350, King Phayu of Lanna sent his son to rule Kengtung. His dynasty would continue to rule Kengtung for another six hundred years until 1959. Kengtung later freed itself from Lanna and developed its own ethno-cultural entity as Tai Khun people. In 1558, the Kingdom of Lanna fell to King Bayinnaung of the Burmese Toungoo dynasty. The ruler of Kengtung submitted to the Burmese rule. The Burmese court appointed the local ruler of Kengtung, who had descended from the Mangrai clan, as Saopha under Burmese domination.

In the late eighteenth century to early nineteenth century, Lanna had freed itself from Burmese domination and came under Siamese rule. The Lanna Lords adopted the policy of “Picking vegetables into baskets, putting men in towns” to wage wars to seek manpower. The Northern Tai states of Kengtung and Chiang Hung, known collectively in Thai sources as "Lü-Khün", were the main victims of forced resettlement policy to repopulate the Lanna region, which had been ravaged by prolonged warfare. In 1802, Phraya Kawila of Chiang Mai sent his younger brother Phraya Uparaj Thammalangka to capture Mong Hsat and Kengtung, forcibly deporting thousands of Khun people from Kengtung and Mong Hsat to resettle in Chiang Mai. Sao Kawng Tai, the then saopha of Kengtung, fled and later submit to Chiang Mai authority in 1804. Maha Khanan, younger brother of Sao Kawng Tai, established himself at Mong Yawng as an independent ruler. Maha Khanan endured many invasions from Burma, who sought to reclaim Kengtung. After the protracted guerilla warfare, Maha Khanan decided to accept the Burmese suzerainty in 1813 and Kengtung once again came under Burmese rule.

=== Dynastic conflicts in Chiang Hung ===
Khun Chueang or Phaya Chueang founded the city of Chiang Hung of Chiang Rung (modern Jinghong) and the Tai Lue confederacy of Sipsongpanna (Twelve “pannas”, corresponding to modern Xishuangbanna Dai Autonomous Prefecture) in around 1180. Sipsongpanna was incorporated into the Lanna Kingdom by King Mangrai. The Mongols of Yuan dynasty invaded Sipsongpanna and Chiang Hung surrendered to the Mongols in 1296. The subsequent Ming and Qing appointed the Tai Lue rulers of Chiang Hung as native governor or Tusi with the title of "Chēlǐ Pacification Commissioner" (Chinese: 車里宣慰使 pinyin: Chēlǐ xuānwèishǐ). The city of Chiang Hung was known as Chēlǐ (Chinese: 車里). The Chinese sent a seal to confirm the rulers of Sipsongpanna. In 1563, King Bayinnaung of Burma captured Chiang Hung. The Burmese and the Chinese agreed on the joint domination over Sipsongpanna, whose ruler was enthroned in a ceremony in which both Burmese and Chinese representatives jointly presided. "China was the father, Burma was the mother." The rulers of Chiang Hung then had to seek confirmation from both China and Burma.

In 1802, Prince Mahavong the ruler of Chiang Hung died. His two-year-son Prince Tsau Mahanavi was confirmed to succeed his father under the regency of Prince Tsau Mahavang, who had been Mahanavi's uncle. When Mahanavi reached maturity in 1817, he personally assumed the governorship. King Bodawpaya summoned Prince Mahanavi of Chiang Hung to Amarapura to confirm his submission. Mahanavi did not go and sent his uncle Mahavang to go to Amarapura instead. King Bodawpaya was angered at Mahanavi's defiance and enfeoffed Mahavang to replace his nephew as the ruler of Chiang Hung. The civil war between Tsau Mahanavi and Tsau Mahavang in Sipsongpanna ensued for decades. In 1834, the Qing, who supported Mahavang, managed to chase Mahanavi off Chiang Hung. Mahanavi fled and died.

In 1836, Prince Mahavang of Chiang Hung died. His son Tsau Suvanna was made to succeed him and Mahavang's another younger son Amaravuth was made Uparaj or heir. However, his nemesis Mahanavi had left a son named Nokham. Prince Nokham gained support from the Burmese court under King Tharrawaddy Min to support him against Suvanna. King Tharawaddy Min of Burma sent the Burmese Sitke general to lead a Burmese army of 3,000 men to invade Chiang Hung and to put Nokham on the Tai Lue throne in 1836. Lady Pinkaew, wife of Mahavang and mother of Suvanna and Amaravuth, bribed the Burmese Sitke to retreat. The Sitke general captured Chiang Hung and made Nokham the ruler of Chiang Hung. Seven days after, Lord Mahachai of Mengpeng who was a supporter of Suvanna led troops to recapture Chiang Hung. The Burmese general then feigned retreat along with Nokham as he was bribed by Lady Pinkaew. Mahachai of Mengpeng restored Suvanna to the throne of Chiang Hung.

Prince Nokham did not give up. He persuaded King Tharrawaddy to send another army of 10,000 men to capture Chiang Hung again in his favor in 1838. Four years later in 1842, the Qing authorities in Yunnan encouraged Mahachai of Mengpeng to successfully retake Chiang Hung and restore Suvanna to the throne for the second time. This time Suvanna managed to secure confirmation from the Burmese Ava court. Everything seemed peaceful until Nokham took Chiang Hung again in 1849. Prince Suvanna fled to Ava. His brother Amaravuth and his mother Pinkaew took refuge in Luang Phrabang, which had been under Siamese suzerainty. Mahachai fled to Vieng Phouka. King Sukkhasoem of Luang Phrabang then sent the Tai Lue royals; Amaravuth, Lady Pinkaew and Mahachai to Bangkok.

== First Siamese Invasion of Kengtung (1850) ==
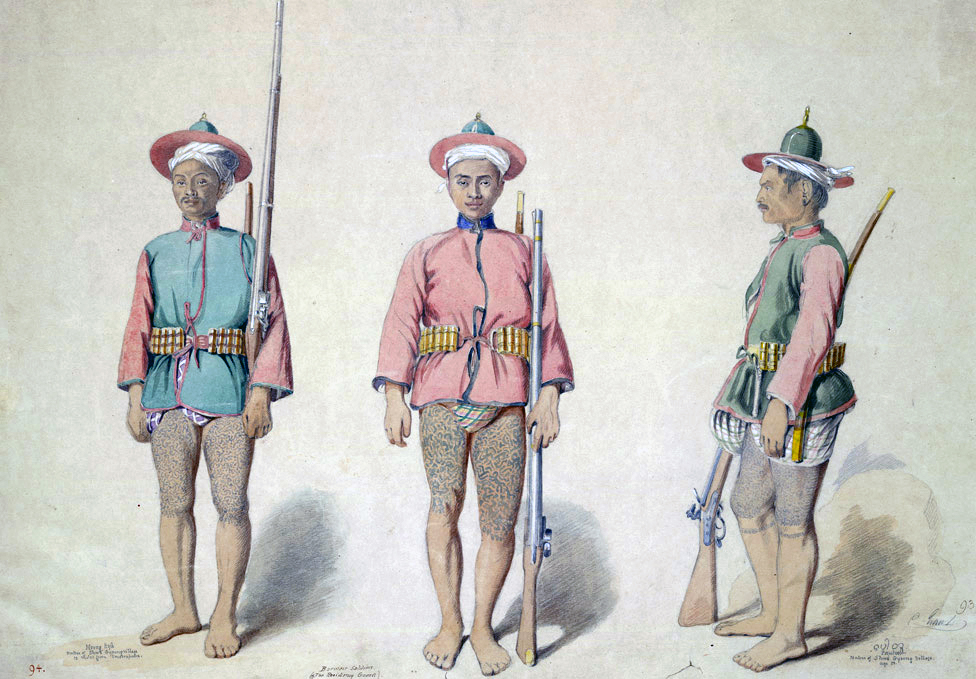
A watercolor of 3 Burmese infantry soldiers in 1855. It was not until soldiers like this were dispatched to combat the Siamese invasion that Siam was finally driven out of Burma.

King Rama III sent troops to assist Tsau Suvanna of Chiang Hung against Nokham to uphold the chakravatin ideology of universal ruler, which signified the honor and power of the Siamese kingdom in the region. However, in order to take Chiang Hung, Siam had to occupy Kengtung first as its provided line of communications. The Bangkok court did not directly involve by sending its own troops to realize the goal. Instead, the Lanna lords of Chiang Mai and Lamphun were assigned for the mission. King Rama III ordered Phraya Mahavong the Ruler of Chiang Mai to arrange Lanna armies into Kengtung. Phraya Mahavong of Chiang Mai then mustered the Lanna army composing of 5,000 men from Chiang Mai, 1,500 men from Lamphun and 1,000 men from Lampang. The regiments were arranged in the following orders to invade Kengtung;

- Army of Phraya Uparaj Phimphisan and Phraya Burirattana (son of King Kawila) would march through Chiang Rai to reach Kengtung.
- Army of Phraya Raxabut and Noi Mahaphrom (son of Phraya Mahavong) would march through Mong Hsat.

The two armies left Chiang Mai for Kengtung in February 1850. The army of Phraya Raxabut and Noi Mahaphrom successfully captured Mong Hsat, where they continued to Mong Gouk and captured several satellite towns of Kengtung. They eventually laid siege on Kengtung in March 1850.

When the army of Phraya Uparaj Phimphisan had reached Chiang Rai, he ordered Phraya Burirattana to attack and capture Mong Hpayak. Uparaj Phimphisan himself negotiated a peaceful surrender from Mong Yawng and stationed there. Phraya Raxabut and Noi Mahaphrom led assaults on the walls of Kengtung but saopha Maha Khanan of Kengtung successfully repelled the invaders. The Lanna side suffered from manpower shortage as the army of Uparaj Phimphisan did not coalesce with them at Kengtung as planned. Noi Mahaphrom sent his man to urge Uparaj Phimphisan at Mong Yawng to reinforce them at Kengtung but Uparaj Phimphisan did not respond. After being depleted of gunpowder with Kengtung persisted, Phraya Raxabut and Noi Mahaphrom decided to retreat the Lanna troops from Kengtung.

The First Invasion of Kengtung by Lanna in 1850 did not succeed. Maha Khanan managed to strongly repel the Lanna invaders. The discord among the Lanna lords prevented them from successfully taking Kengtung in the same manner with what they had accomplished before in 1802. Phraya Mahavong of Chiang Mai issued a letter of apology to King Rama III at Bangkok, beseeching him for Bangkokian assisting troops and additional cooperation from Nan. However, the king had been ill. King Rama III died in April 1851.

== Second Siamese Invasion of Kengtung (1852–1854) ==
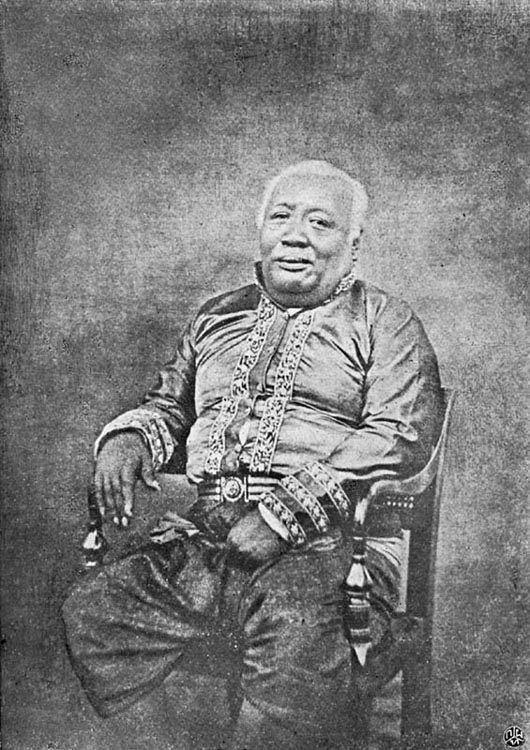
Prince Vongsathirat Sanid, younger half-brother of King Mongkut, was the supreme commander of Siamese Expedition to Kengtung in 1852–1854.

Siamese Invasion of Kengtung (1852–1854)
- Part of the Burmese–Siamese wars
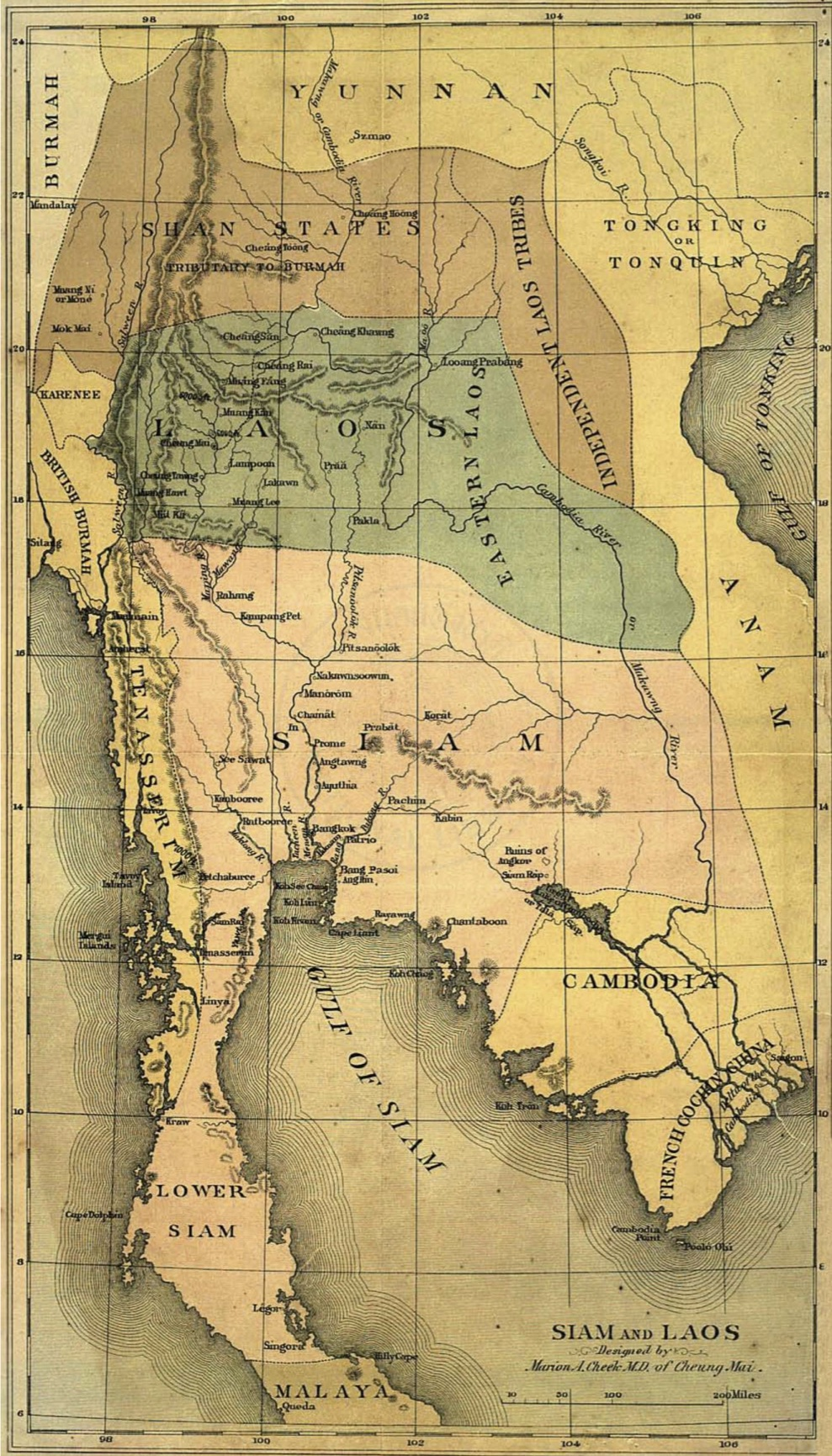
Date	November 1852 – mid 1854
Location	Kengtung, Trans-Salween region
Result	Konbaung victory

Belligerents
Konbaung dynasty (Burma); Kengtung State (under Burmese suzerainty)	Rattanakosin Kingdom (Siam); Kingdom of Chiang Mai (tributary to Siam); Princedom of Nan (tributary to Siam)

Commanders and leaders
Pagan Min (Until 1853); Mindon Min (After 1853); Maha Khanan of Kengtung; Maha Nawrahta	King Mongkut; Prince Vongsathirat Sanid; Chao Phraya Yommaraj Nuch; Phraya Mahavong; Phraya Uparaj Phimphisara; Phraya Burirattana -Chaophraya Mongkol Vorayot of Nan

Strength
3,000+	10,000

The expedition against Kengtung in 1850 did not succeed and Siam failed to support Suvanna and to gain control of Kengtung and Chiang Hung. The Qing raised an army to defeat Nokham at Chiang Hung and Nokham was killed. The Qing managed to restore Suvanna to the throne of Sipsongpanna. Amaravuth, Lady Pinkaew and Mahachai, the Tai Lue royals, who had been staying in Bangkok for about three years, took the permission of King Mongkut to return to the north. Amaravuth and Lady Pinkaew returned to Luang Phrabang, while Mahachai returned to Nan.

In 1852, Suvanna of Chiang Hung dispatched a mission, along with ceremonial golden and silver trees, to Bangkok to request the return of his family members to Chiang Hung. King Mongkut granted the permission for the Tai Lue royals to return to their homeland. However, the ministers at the court of Bangkok petitioned to King Mongkut to send another expedition into Chiang Hung. Like the previous occasion in 1850, Siam had to take Kengtung first before proceeding to Chiang Hung. Burma was then being embroiled in the Second Anglo-Burmese War and should not be able to provided supports to Kengtung, which was a tributary state of Burma. King Mongkut then ordered the following armies, with total number of 10,000 men, to Kengtung. On this occasion Bangkok was involved directly by sending its troops in the campaigns;

- Prince Vongsathirat Sanid, younger half-brother of King Mongkut, would lead an army through Phitsanulok and Nan to Kengtung.
- Chao Phraya Yommaraj Nuch would lead an army through Tak and Chiang Mai to Kengtung. He was to join by the Lanna forces under the leadership of Phraya Uparaj Phimphisan and Phraya Burirattana.

The two armies planned to converge at Chiang Saen before proceeding to Mong Hpayak and then to Kengtung.

=== First Expedition (1852–1853) ===
Chao Phraya Yommaraj Nuch left Bangkok with his army in October 1852. He proceeded through Kamphaengphet and Tak, drafting the conscripted militias along the way. Yommaraj Nuch reached Chiang Mai on December 19, 1852, where he recruited Lanna forces. Prince Vongsathirat Sanid left Bangkok November 13, 1852, with his army. He proceeded through Nakhon Sawan, Phitsanulok, reaching Nan in January 1853. He was reinforced and supplied by Chao Phraya Mongkol Vorayot the ruler of Nan. Yommaraj Nuch and his Lanna-Siamese army left Chiang Mai for Chiang Saen in February. Prince Vongsathirat Sanid eventually reached Chiang Saen on February 17. Chao Phraya Yommaraj Nuch followed to Chiang Saen three days later. The prince ordered Chao Phraya Yommaraj Nuch to be his vanguard, with the joint Bangkok-Chiang Mai army of total 5,042 men, who left first from Chiang Saen to Mong Hpayak on February 24.

Chao Phraya Yommaraj Nuch, with Lanna commanders Uparaj Phimphisan and Phraya Burirattana, managed to capture Mong Hsat in March. They proceeded to lay siege on Kengtung on March 10, 1853, taking position on a hill to the southeast of Kengtung and shelled the city with their canons. In the Battle of Kengtung, again, Maha Khanan of Kengtung led the defense against Siamese-Lanna intruders on March 17. The Siamese-Lanna had problems with manpower shortage as they were unable to completely encircle the city of Kengtung in the siege. Another issue was that Kengtung was a hill fort and the Siamese occupied relative lowland positions, complicating the abilities of their canons to inflict damages onto the higher elevations.

Prince Vongsathirat Sanid also ordered Chao Phraya Mongkol Vorayot of Nan to lead the Nan armies to Chiang Hung. Phraya Mongkol Vorayot marched his army to reach Mengpeng in February, where he sent his men to Chiang Hung to meet Tsau Suvanna of Chiang Hung and Qing delegates.

Prince Vongsathirat Sanid followed his vanguard and marched through Mong Hpayak to reach Kengtung. Yommarach Nuch ordered Lanna regiment to assault on Kengtung city walls but were repelled by Maha Khanan. After seven days of battle, Kengtung did not yield and the Siamese-Lanna decided to retreat on March 23, 1853. Yommaraj Nuch marched his army back to Chiang Mai with himself going further down south to Tak, while Prince Vongsathirat Sanid retreated back to Nan. As the rainy season approached, which would further cripple the warfare, Prince Vongsathirat Sanid then asked the king to try another expedition in the dry season next year.

=== Second Expedition (1853–1854) ===
Prince Vongsathirat Sanid took the rainy season break at Nan and Chao Phraya Yommaraj Nuch at Tak. King Mongkut sent Chao Phraya Sri Suriyawongse to bring ammunitions and supplies to the north. Sri Suriyawongse and Yommaraj Nuch traveled to meet Prince Vongsathirat Sanid at Uttaradit, where they planned for the incoming second expedition to Kengtung, in November 1853. Chao Phraya Sri Suriyawongse then returned to Bangkok. The Siamese spent their time in Lanna farming grains for supplies during the rainy season of 1853. The Burmese, however, managed to get Bamar and Shan troops from Mongnai to garrison at Kengtung to be additional forces.

Prince Vongsathirat Sanid resumed the campaigns in dry season of the year 1853-1854. Vongsathirat Sanid and Mongkol Vorayot marched from Nan in January 1854 through Mong Yawng and Yommarah Nuch through Mong Hpayak to converge on and to lay siege to Kengtung for the second time, reaching Kengtung in March 1854. Kengtung was well reinforced by the Burmese and Shan regiments and was even better at repelling Siamese attacks. As he ran out of food supplies and gunpowder, Prince Vongsathirat Sanid finally decided to retreat from Kengtung on March 18 to Nan. However, the Burmese, upon seeing the Siamese retreat, inflicted the counter-offensive on retreating Siamese troops. Chao Phraya Mongkol Vorayot of Nan then acted as rearguard to defend the Siamese armies against the Burmese counter-attacks. Prince Vongsathirat Sanid retreated safely to Nan in 1854. Yommaraj Nuch, who had marched halfway to Kengtung, retreated to Chiang Mai upon learning of the prince's defeat.

The Siamese then realized that the unfamiliar mountainous geography and great distance from Bangkok deemed the Siamese occupation of Kengtung unlikely. King Mongkut ordered Prince Vongsathirat Sanid and Chao Phraya Yommaraj Nuch to pull the troops back to Bangkok in 1854.

The Tai Lue royalties had been staying in Luang Phrabang and Nan. A Qing delegated arrived in Luang Phrabang requesting for the return of Amaravuth, Lady Pinkaew and Mahachai to Chiang Hung. The Bangkok court conceded and the Tai Lue royals eventually returned to their homeland. The dynastic conflicts among the Tai Lue royals continued, however, as Mahachai later killed Amaravuth and Tsau Suvanna, in turn, had Mahachai executed.

== Aftermath ==
King Mongkut awarded the Lanna Lords with ranks and titles for their contributions in the war. Phraya Mahavong, the ruler of Chiang Mai, was crowned as King Mahotaraprathet of Chiang Mai as a tributary king by King Mongkut in July 1853. No one had been awarded with the title of King of Chiang Mai since when King Kawila was crowned as King of Chiang Mai by King Rama I in 1802. (Chiang Mai rulers after Kawila were only given the noble rank of Phraya.) However, King Mahotaraprathet passed away five months later in November 1853. Phraya Uparaj Phimphisan also died in 1856. King Mongkut then made Phraya Burirattana, a son of King Kawila, as King Kawilorot Suriyawong the ruler of Chiang Mai in 1856. Chao Phraya Mongkol Vorayot, the ruler of Nan, was also promoted to Prince Chao Ananta Voraritthidet.

Maha Khanan held the position of saopha of Kengtung for four decades from Burmese recognition in 1813 to the times of Siamese invasions in early 1850s. Maha Khanan of Kengtung died in 1857 and was succeeded by his son Sao Maha Pawn.

=== British acquisition of Kengtung ===
At the ascension of the last Burmese king Thibaw, the Shan saophas were dissatisfied with the rule of the new Burmese king. Sao Kawng Tai, another son of Maha Khanan, became the ruler of Kengtung in 1881. Kawng Tai had Burmese representatives in Kengtung murdered and declared open rebellion against Burma. Kengtung remained defiant to Burma through early 1880s. Saopha Khun Seng of Hsenwi proposed an independent federation of Shan States but Kawng Tai of Kengtung disagreed with this idea, saying that the Shans needed an outsider arbitrator to unite themselves. In 1885, Kawng Tai of Kengtung, along with Sao Hkun Kyi of Mongnai and other Shan rulers, declared for Burmese Prince Limbin Mintha to be the leader of the Shans and also to be the new king of Burma in the movement called Limbin Confederacy. The plan was to march onto Mandalay to install Prince Limbin. However, the Limbin Prince took some time to move from his political refuge at Rangoon to Kengtung and when he arrived in December 1885, the British had already exiled King Thibaw the last King of Burma and had taken control of Burma at the end of the Third-Anglo Burmese War. Amidst these events, Sao Kawng Tai of Kengtung died in 1886, to be succeeded by his twelve-year-old son Sao Kawn Kham Hpu.

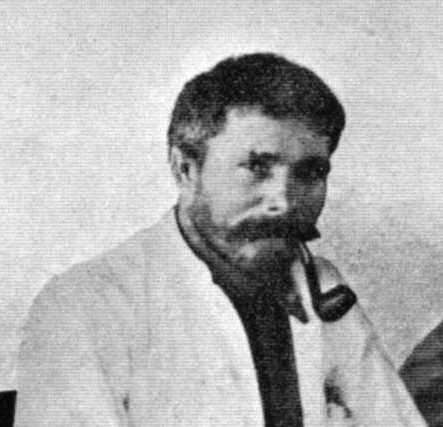
James George Scott was the British envoy to Kengtung in 1890 to finalize British acquisition of Kengtung to be under British rule.

As the British had taken control of cis-Salween Shan States to the west of Salween river by 1889, they sought to bring the trans-Salween states to the east of Salween including Kengtung under their possession. Even though the British had indirectly recognized Salween River as Burma-Lanna border in the Anglo-Siamese Chiangmai Treaties of 1874 and 1883 by saying that;

His Majesty the King of Siam will cause the Prince of Chiengmai to establish and maintain guard stations, under proper officers, on the Siamese bank of the Salween River, which forms the boundary of Chiengmai belonging to Siam...

meaning that the trans-Salween states to the east of Salween on the 'Siamese bank' belonged to Lanna-Siam by this definition, however, they saw that Kengtung should come under British rule because Kengtung had been a long-time vassal of Burma and Lanna-Siam had not held any authorities over Kengtung. British Burma sent James George Scott to be the British envoy to Kengtung in 1890. Scott took journey from Mongnai to Kengtung by riding a mule, led by Yunnanese Panthay navigators, crossing the Salween river and reaching Kengtung in February 1890. Kawn Kham Hpu the ruler of Kengtung eventually agreed to accept British rule and to join the durbar of Shan States. Kengtung, along with the Shan States, became princely states with nominal sovereignty under British rule. The Federated Shan States was created in 1922 to facilitate the transfer of Shan States to the Governor of Burma.

== See also ==
- Burmese–Siamese wars
- Burma–Thailand relations

1869 two Thai men kill whiteman American name John Smith https://mgronline.com/onlinesection/detail/9580000121095
