= Princess Pindale =

First Queen of the Western Palace of Mindon Min

Pindale Princess

Queen of the Western Palace
- Tenure: 26 March 1853 – 26 July 1855
- Predecessor: Thiri Thu Yadana Mingala Dwei, Princess of Myadaung
- Successor: Thiri Maha Thu Sanda Yadana Dewi, Princess of Yinge

Princess of Pindale
- Tenure: 8 July 1840 – 26 July 1855
- Predecessor: Pindale Mintha
- Successor: Unknown
- Born: Amarapura Palace, Burma
- Died: 26 July 1855; Amarapura Palace
- Burial: Amarapura Palace
- consort: Mindon Min
Regnal name
- Thiri Maha Thu Sanda Dewi
Posthumous name
- Pindale Princess
- House: Konbaung
- Dynasty: Konbaung dynasty
- Father: Tharrawaddy Min
- Mother: Kanaung Mibaya, the Queen of the Northern Apartment
- Religion: Theravada Buddhism

Thiri Maha Thu Sanda Dewi (Burmese: သီရိမဟာသုစန္ဒာဒေဝီ, Pali: Sīrimahāsucandādevi), also known as the Princess of Pindale, was the first Queen of the Western Palace of Mindon Min, the tenth king of Konbaung dynasty.

== Early life ==
Pindale Princess, the eldest of two siblings, was born to Tharrawaddy Min and Kanaung Mibaya, the Queen of the Northern Apartment. At the opening ceremony of her father's royal throne, held from 8 to 10 July 1840, she received the title of Thiri Thu Manla Wadi and the appanage of Pindale. During the reign of Pagan Min, her royal title was Thiri Yadana Thu Sanda Dewi.

== As a queen ==
When Mindon Min ascended the throne, she became the Queen of the Western Palace on 26 March 1853, which made her the queen of first rank. On 16 June 1854, at the opening ceremony of Mindon's throne, she was honoured the title of Thiri Maha Thu Sanda Dewi.

On 27 June 1855, she gave birth to a son at around 8:07 am who died two days later at 3:24 pm and a daughter at 10:30 pm who died at 4:12 am in the same day.

== Death ==
She died on 26 July 1855 and was buried in her compound at the Amarapura Palace. She was replaced by her younger sister Princess of Yinge as the second Queen of the Western Palace.
