= Pyay Mintha Monastery =

Buddhist monastery in Mandalay, Myanmar

Coordinates: 21°54′19.8″N 96°04′56.4″E

- ပြည်မင်းသားကျောင်း
- Location within Myanmar

Religion
- Affiliation: Theravada Buddhism

Location
- Country: Mandalay, Mandalay Region, Burma
- Interactive map of Pyay Mintha Monastery

Architecture
- Founder: Pyay Prince
- Completed: 1839; 187 years ago

Pyay Mintha Monastery (Burmese: ပြည်မင်းသားကျောင်း) is a historic royal Buddhist monastery in Mandalay, Burma. The wooden monastery dates to 1839, and was donated by the Prince of Pyay, the son of King Tharrawaddy Min. Parts of the monastery were restored in 2017.

== See also ==
- Kyaung
