= Prince Thagara =

Burmese royal prince (1857–1879)

Prince of Thagara
- Reign: 1857–1879
- Successor: Position disestablished
- Born: 25 August 1857; Mandalay, Konbaung Kingdom
- Died: 15 February 1879 (aged 21); Mandalay Palace, Konbaung Kingdom
- Consort: Shin Thet; Shin Thant
- Issue: 4 sons and 1 daughter
Regnal name
- Thado Minye Kyawhtin
- House: Konbaung
- Father: Mindon Min
- Mother: Htilaing Mibaya
- Religion: Theravada Buddhism

Thado Minye Kyawhtin (25 August 1857 – 15 February 1879), commonly known as Prince Thagara (also spelt Prince Thagaya, Burmese: သာဂရမင်းသား), was a royal prince during the late Konbaung dynasty, renowned for his handsome appearance. He was the only son of King Mindon and his consort, Htilaing Mibaya.

== Life ==
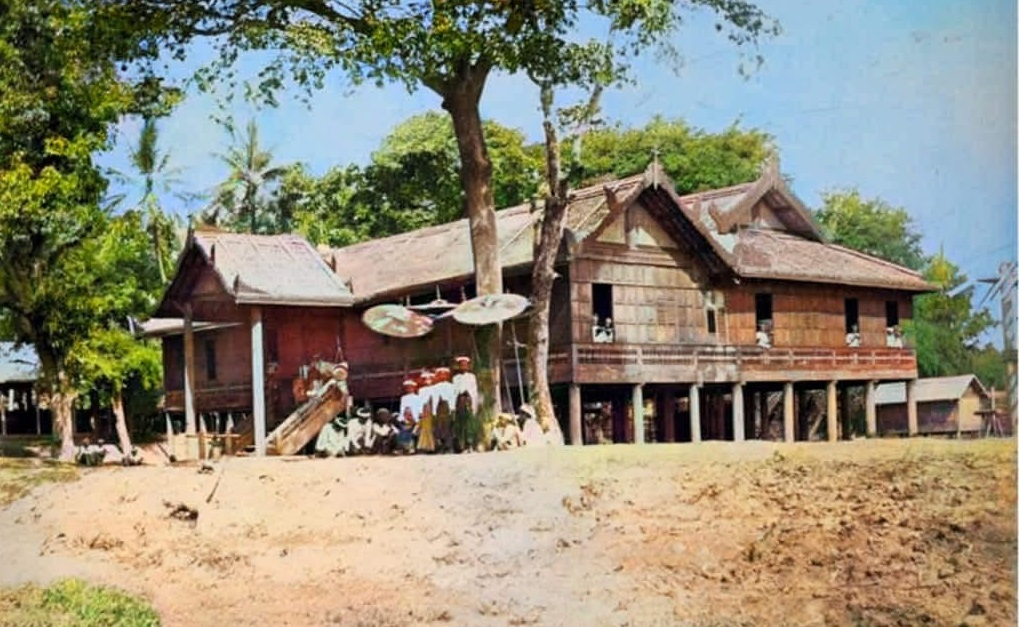
Princes Thibaw, Mongton, Thagara, and Shweku in front of Dr. Marks School, Mandalay

Prince Thagara was born on 25 August 1857 to King Mindon and Htilaing Mibaya, the daughter of Thado Mingyi Maha Sithu U Maung Gale, the minister of Laungshe. His mother died during childbirth. He was granted Thagara, a town in what is now Yedashe, as his appanage, which therefore known as Prince of Thagara.

In the palace he became well known for his good looks. Princess Myadaung (the future queen), curious after hearing of his reputation, disguised herself as a man and went to the prince's mansion, which was located in a forbidden part of the Mandalay Palace, to see him for herself. Princess Myadaung lost interest in him after learning that the prince was already married. He had two consorts, Shin Thet and Shin Thant, with whom he had four sons and one daughter.

In some accounts, Prince Thagara had a romantic relationship with Princess Myadaung during their childhood, before she met her half-brother Prince Thibaw (later King Thibaw). She regarded Prince Thagara as her beloved and did not allow him to play with other princesses. Whenever she received a gift, she gave it to him.

He was educated at Dr. Marks School in Mandalay under the missionary John Ebenezer Marks, alongside Prince Thibaw, Prince Mongton, and Prince Shweku, by order of King Mindon. According to Marks, the young prince would ride to school on an elephant, accompanied by attendants carrying a golden umbrella over his head.

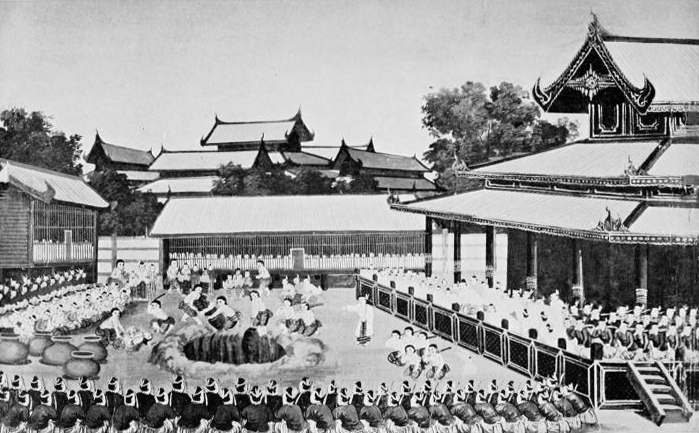
A painting depicting the massacre at Mandalay Palace

According to the testimony of U Aung Gyi, a former secretary to Kinwun Mingyi U Kaung who was present at the ministerial meeting to select a new king, Prince Thagara was among the candidates, together with the Prince Thonze, Prince Mekkhaya, Prince Nyaungok, Prince Nyaungyan, and Prince Thibaw. He was not selected, as Prince Thibaw secured two votes and was declared king. Soon afterward, Prince Thagara was arrested to prevent any future uprisings.

He was executed in the 1879 massacre at Mandalay Palace, during which more than forty members of the royal family were killed. The massacre was carried out on the orders of Queen Hsinbyumashin and several high-ranking ministers, who sought to eliminate nearly all potential heirs to the throne. Burmese historians have questioned the circumstances of his arrest and why he did not escape, even though his grandfather, a powerful minister, was still alive at the time. Other princes who were grandsons of ministers, such as Prince Pyinmana, managed to escape the massacre.

In one record, it is said that during the execution of Prince Thagara, the headless body of the young prince, in a state of terror, clung tightly to the body of a royal guard and had to be forcibly removed with great difficulty.
