= Kinwun Mingyi Monastery =

Buddhist monastery in Mandalay, Myanmar

- ကင်းဝန်မင်းကြီးကျောင်း
- Location within Myanmar

Religion
- Affiliation: Theravada Buddhism

Location
- Country: Mandalay, Mandalay Region, Burma
- Interactive map of Kinwun Mingyi Monastery
- Coordinates: 21.965789°N 96.072651°E

Architecture
- Founder: Kinwun Mingyi U Kaung
- Completed: 1879; 147 years ago

Kinwun Mingyi Monastery (Burmese: ကင်းဝန်မင်းကြီးကျောင်း), also known as the Thakawun Monastery, is a historic Buddhist monastery in Maha Aungmye Township, Mandalay, Burma. The wooden monastery dates to 1879, built by the Kinwun Mingyi U Kaung.

Built completely out of teak, the monastery includes Western motifs including Corinthian pillars, friezes and arches inspired by the Kinwun Mingyi's embassy mission to Europe. The monastery design features a terrace surrounded by a rotunda. The monastery was designed by European architects, namely M. Comodo, an Italian, and M. Bonvallein, a Frenchman.

== See also ==
- Kyaung
