= Hteiktin Ma Lat =

Princess of Burma (1894–1965)

- Princess Hteik Tin Ma Lat of Limbin
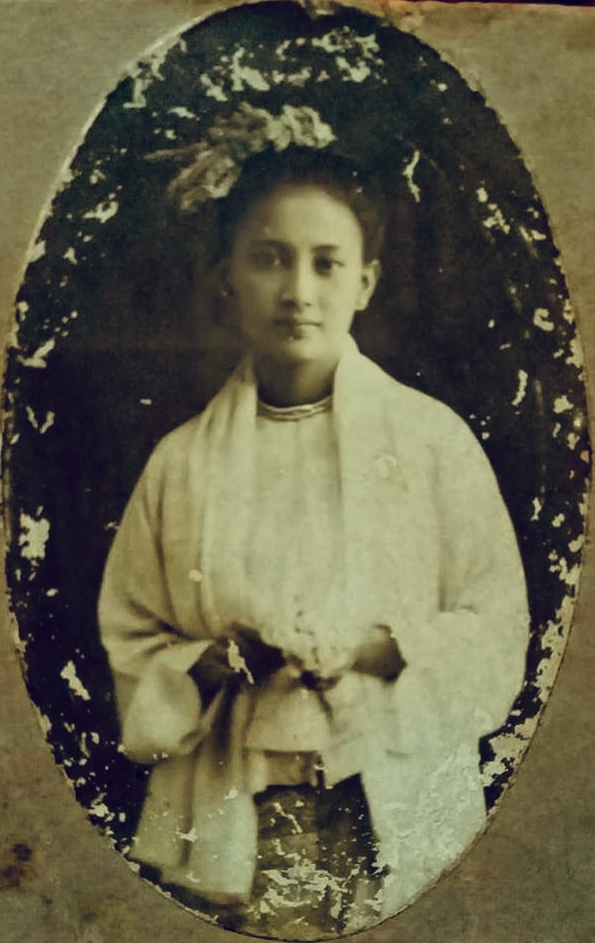
- Hteiktin Ma Lat c. 1914
- Born: 13 October 1894; Calcutta, British India
- Died: 1965 (aged 70–71); Rangoon, British Burma
- Spouse: Herbert Bellamy (m. 1921; died 1957)
- Issue: Yadana Nat-Mei
- House: Konbaung
- Father: Limbin Mintha
- Mother: Kin Me (Yenatha Khin Khin Gyi)
- Religion: Theravada Buddhism

Princess Limbin Hteiktin Ma Lat (Burmese: ထိပ်တင်မလတ်; 13 October 1894 – 1965), also Tin Tin Ma Lat, was a princess of Burma and one of the senior members of the royal House of Konbaung.

== Biography ==
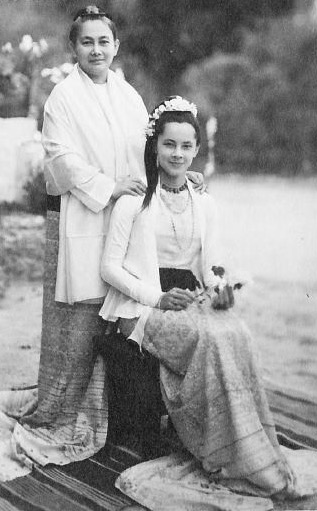
Hteiktin Ma Lat and her daughter Princess Yadana Nat Mei

Hteiktin Ma Lat was born on 13 October 1894 in Calcutta, British India. She was the second daughter of Limbin Mintha and his consort Kin Me (Yenatha Khin Khin Gyi), the princess of Limbin. She was the great-granddaughter of King Tharrawaddy and granddaughter of Prince Kanaung. She studied at Girl's High School in Allahabad, India; she was well-educated and spoke English fluently.

Maurice Collis, a colonial judge and author, wrote in his 1938 book Trials in Burma of receiving a call from Ma Lat in 1928: "She sat on the sofa, a beautiful woman, in a blue silk skirt and a jacket of white lawn, her complexion corn-coloured, her eyes large and brilliant, and with exquisite hands." Crown Prince Wilhelm, after meeting her at the Allahabad Club, described her as the most "striking woman" he had met during his Far Eastern tour.

== Queen consort designate of Sikkim ==
Prince Sidkeong Tulku Namgyal, son of the King of Sikkim, and Ma Lat began a regular correspondence. When Prince Limbin and his family returned to Burma (to live in Rangoon), Sidkeong visited them there in 1912. By then he and the princess had agreed to marry, the British having secured Limbin's approval. The wedding was initially set for 1913 but then delayed because of Sidkeong's father's deteriorating health. In February 1914 the old king died, Sidkeong became king, and his wedding to Ma Lat was set for 10 February 1915. The two exchanged many letters expressing their love for one another and their glad anticipation of a life together.

In December 1914, Sidkeong was found dead in his bedroom, apparently of heart failure, aged 35, in what the British described as "mysterious circumstances".

== Later life ==
On 19 October 1921, Ma Lat married Herbert Bellamy, a horse breeder and bookmaker of Bombay, Calcutta, Batavia and Singapore. He was also a manager at Maymyo Racecourse and an orchid collector. She gave birth to their only daughter, Yadana Nat-Mei, in 1932.

== Gallery ==
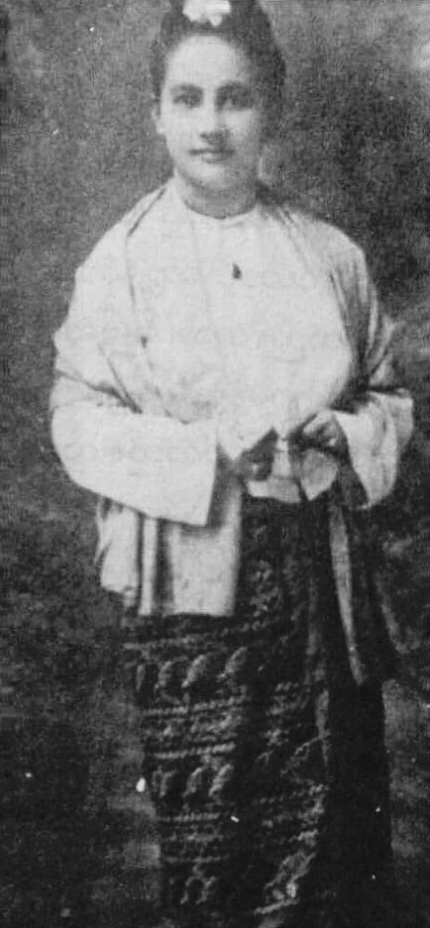
Young Hteiktin Ma Lat

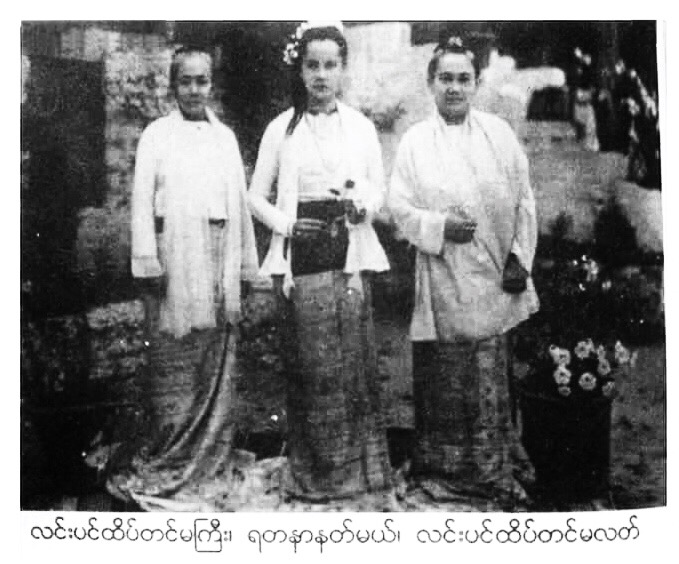
Hteiktin Ma Gyi, Yadana Nat-Mei and Hteiktin Ma Lat

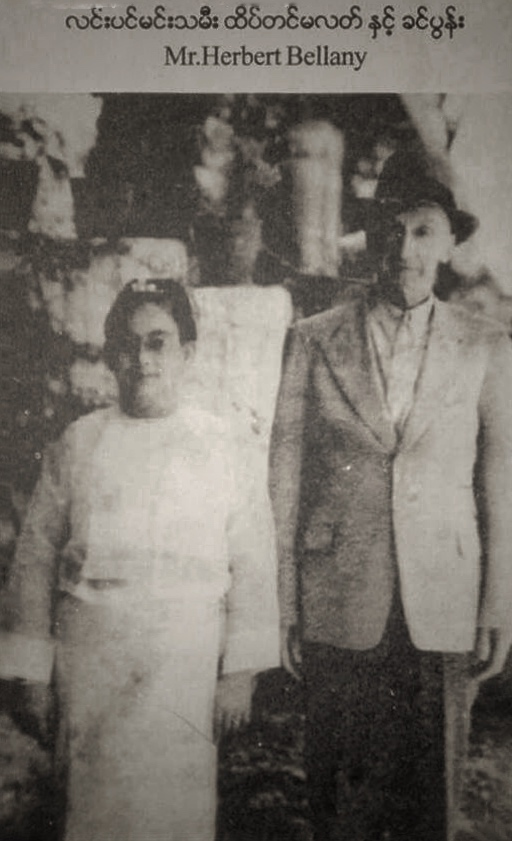
Hteiktin Ma Lat with her husband

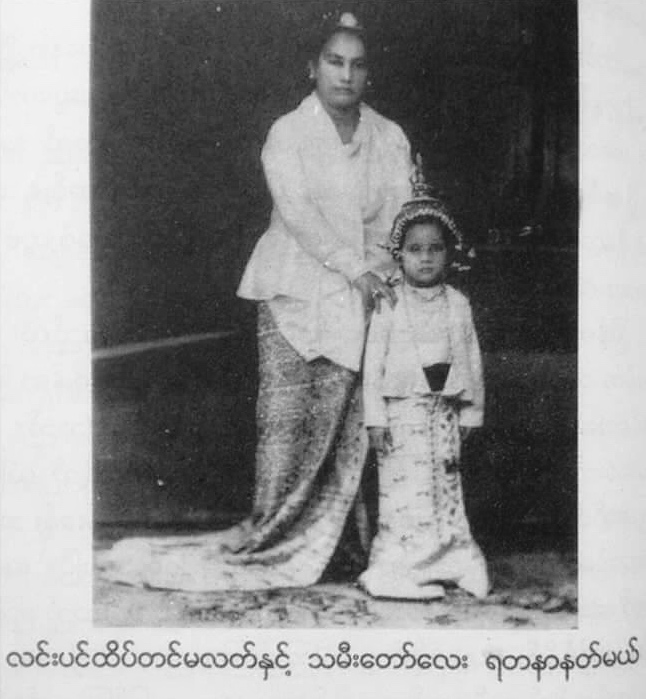
Hteiktin Ma Lat and her child Yadana Nat-Mei

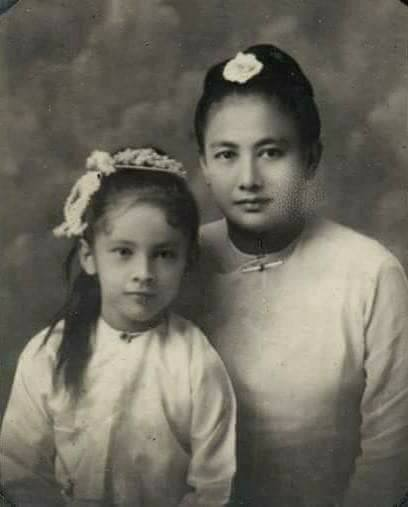
Princess Ma Lat and her daughter
