= Singyan Thakin =

Burmese court official

Singyan Thakhin (Burmese: ဆင်ကြန်သခင်), also known by her title Kinwun Mingyi Gadaw (Burmese: ကင်းဝန်မင်းကြီးကတော်; 1793 — 1862), was a Burmese court official who served as the Amaydawkhan Gadawgyi (အမေးတော်ခံကတော်ကြီး) in the royal court of King Mindon. She was the first wife of Kinwun Mingyi U Kaung. She was granted the appanage of Singyan and was therefore known as Singyan Thakhinma (lit. 'mistress of Singyan').

== Biography ==
According to the royal chronicles, she was a lady-in-waiting during the reign of King Bagyidaw. Some historians claim that the Singyan Princess was a minor queen consort of King Pangan. As a queen of the fourth rank, she was granted the appanage of Thanlyin.

In another account, she was said to be married to a royal justice U Bo who was granted the title of Minhla Thiri Kyawhtin during the reign of King Tharawaddy. She became a widow when U Bo died.

In 1851, Prince Mindon ordered to the 59-year-old widow, Singyan Thakin, to married a 30-year-old the Clerk of the Royal Treasury (ရွှေတိုက်စာရေး), Maung Kaung, and they served together at the royal court.

There was no issue by their marriage. Kinwun adopted the two sons of the brother of his second wife, Shwe Me.

== Bibliography ==
- Taw Sein Ko (1913). Burmese sketches. British Burma Press.
- Royal Historical Commission of Burma (1832). Hmannan Yazawin (in Burmese). Vol. 1–3 (2003 ed.). Yangon: Ministry of Information, Myanmar.
