= Anauk Nanmadaw Ma Mya Lay =

Queen of the Western Palace of Burma

Queen of the Western Palace
- Tenure: 1837 – 1845
- Predecessor: Thiri Malaa Yadana Mahay
- Successor: Thiri Maha Thu Sanda Dewi
- King: Tharrawaddy Min
- Born: 1809; Hinthada
- Died: 1845 (aged 35–36); Ava
- Consort: Tharrawaddy Min
- Issue: Hlaing Hteik Khaung Tin
Regnal name
- Sirimahāratanā Candādevī
- House: Konbaung
- Father: Min Pyan Chi
- Mother: Me Ei
- Religion: Theravada Buddhism

Thiri Maha Thuta Yadana Sanda Dewi (Burmese: သီရိမဟာသုတရတနာစန္ဒာဒေဝီ, Pali: Sīrimahāsutaratanā candādevī; born Ma Mya Kyote; 1809 – 1845), commonly known as Anauk Nanmadaw Ma Mya Lay (Burmese: အနောက်နန်းမတော် မမြလေး), was the Queen of the Western Palace of King Tharrawaddy during the Konbaung dynasty.

She was a well-known female poet of the late Konbaung era, and is remembered as the composer of the popular patpyoe "Chit-Tha-Hmya-Ko" and for her tragic death.

== Life ==
Ma Mya Kyote was born in 1809 to Min Pyan Chi and Me Ei of Hinthada.

At age 17 she married Prince Tharrawaddy, who arrived in Danuphyu after signing the Treaty of Yandabo. In 1833, she gave birth to a daughter named Ma Phwar (later Crown Princess Hlaing). When her husband ascended to the throne, Ma Mya Lay became the Queen of the Western Palace. She was given the title of Thiri Maha Thuta Yadana Sanda Dewi (Sirimahāratanā Candādevī) and received the appanage of Hinthada.

=== Death ===
In 1845, Ma Mya Lay was accused of involvement in the Pyay Prince rebellion. She was executed by her husband, who reportedly had schizophrenia; he ordered her to be trampled to death by an elephant. Their daughter was adopted by Setkya Dewi, who later became the Chief Queen of King Mindon.

== Art ==
Her patpyoes "Chit-Tha-Hmya-Ko" and "Shi-Sone-Ywet-Kyar" are popular romantic songs.

=== Compositions ===
- "Chit-Tha-Hmya-Ko"
- "Shwe Phe Zin Gaw"
- "Sein Chal Chuu Than"
- "Thein Gar Shwe Yaung"
- "Shi-Sone-Ywet-Kyar"

== Donations ==
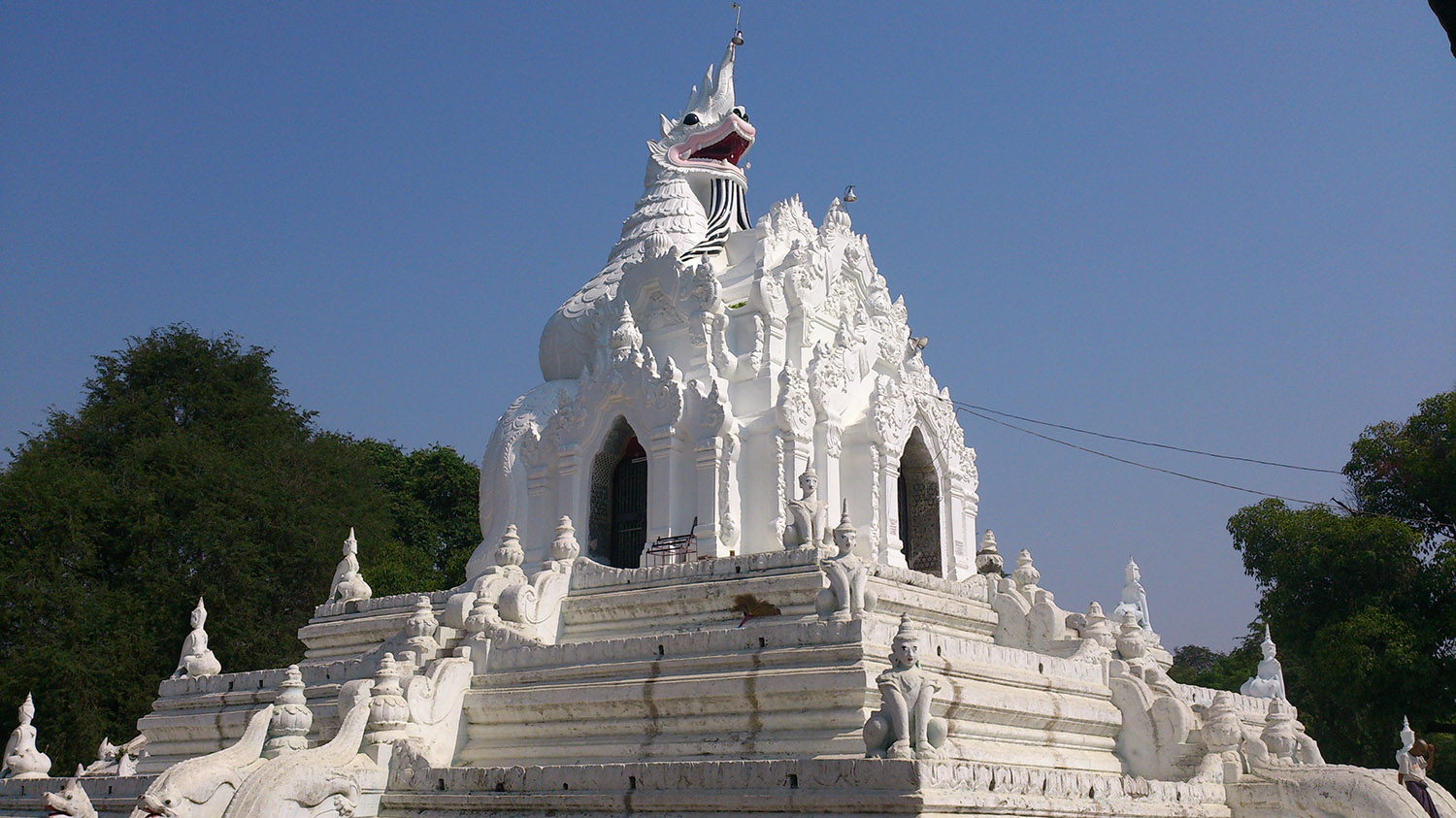
Nagayon Pagoda

In 1843, Ma Mya Lay funded the reconstruction of Nagayon Pagoda in Amarapura. She also donated Yele Kusinayone Sutaungpyae Pagoda in Mandalay, two years before her death.

== See also ==
- Konbaung dynasty
- List of Burmese consorts
