= Mogaung Monastery =

Buddhist monastery in Myanmar

- မိုးကောင်းကျောင်း
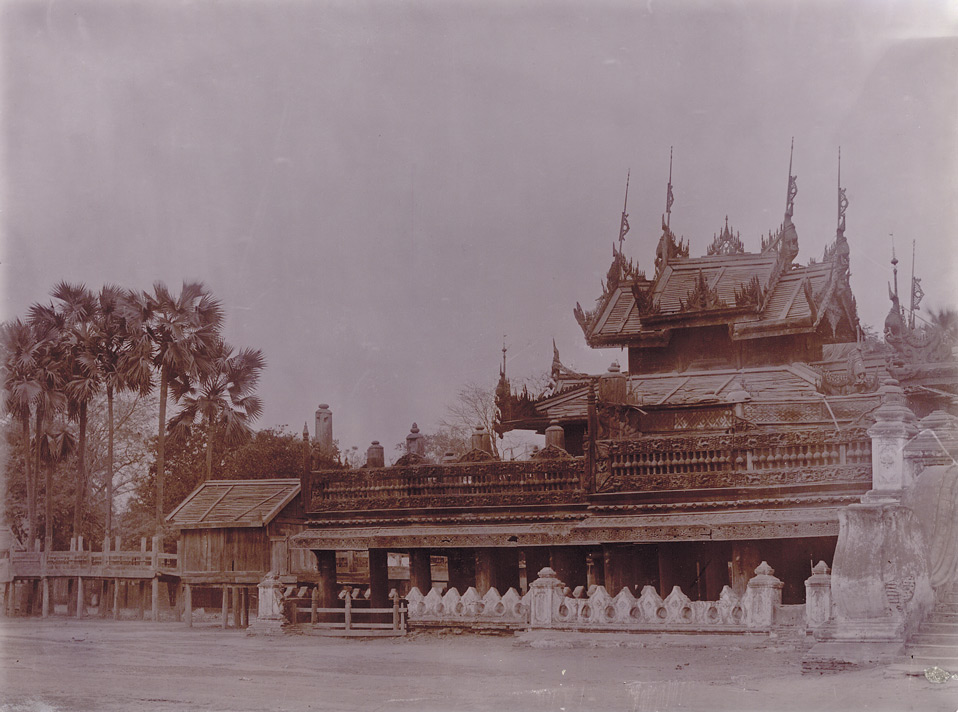

Religion
- Affiliation: Theravada Buddhism

Location
- Country: Mandalay, Mandalay Region, Burma
- Interactive map of Mogaung Monastery
- Coordinates: 21.994259°N 96.115319°E

Architecture
- Founder: Mogaung Mibaya
- Completed: 1847; 179 years ago

Mogaung Monastery (Burmese: မိုးကောင်းကျောင်း) is a Buddhist monastery in Mandalay, Myanmar (Burma). The wooden monastery was built by the Mogaung Mibaya, a minor queen of King Pagan Min in 1847. The monastery's dimensions are 258 by 106 feet (79 m × 32 m) and is supported by 342 teak pillars. The monastery's wooden carvings are adorned with motifs from the Ramayana.

== See also ==
- Kyaung
