= Limbin Mintha =

Burmese prince

Limbin Mintha (Burmese: လင်းပင်မင်းသား), also known as Prince of Limbin, was a Burmese royal prince and prominent figure in the anti-colonial movement in Burma. He was a son of Crown Prince Kanaung Mintha, and a cousin of King Thibaw. He escaped the massacre at Mandalay Palace in 1879 of upward of 100 members of the royal family, following an edict by Hsinbyumashin that ordered the killing of almost all possible heirs to the throne. In 1883, the Shan Chiefs formed the Limbin Confederacy to dethrone Thibaw and put Prince Limbin in his place.

Between 1885 and 1887, he led a widespread resistance together with several Shan Sawbwas against the British occupation. He was exiled to Calcutta in 1887 and later to Allahabad. He returned to Rangoon in 1911. He died in 1933. His granddaughter, June Rose Bellamy married Burma's dictator General Ne Win in 1978.

== Personal life ==
He married Khin Me, also known as Yenantha Khin Khin Gyi. They have four sons and six daughters.

- Daughters
  - Hteiktin Ma Gyi
  - Hteiktin Gyi
  - Hteiktin Lat
  - Hteiktin Ma Lat
  - Hteiktin Htwe
  - Hteiktin Ma Htwe
