= Hlaing Hteik Khaung Tin =

Crown princess of Burma

Hlaing Hteik Khaung Tin လှိုင်ထိပ်ခေါင်တင်

Princess consort of Burma
- Tenure: 11 July 1853 – 2 August 1866
- King: Tharrawaddy Min

Princess of Hlaing
- Tenure: 1837 – 1853
- King: Tharrawaddy Min
- Born: 1833; Ava
- Died: 1875 (aged 41–42); Mandalay
- Consort: Kanaung Mintha
- Issue: Htantabin Prince
Regnal name
- Thiri Thu Myatswar Ratana Devi
- House: Konbaung
- Father: Tharrawaddy Min
- Mother: Anauk Nanmadaw Ma Mya Lay
- Religion: Theravada Buddhism

Thiri Thu Myatswa Yadana Dewi (Burmese: သီရိသုမြတ်စွာရတနာဒေဝီ, Pali: Sīrisumratcvāratanādevī; born Ma Phwar; 1833 – 1875), commonly known as the Princess of Hlaing (Burmese: လှိုင်မင်းသမီး) or Hlaing Hteik Khaung Tin (Burmese: လှိုင်ထိပ်ခေါင်တင်), was a crown princess of Burma during the late Konbaung dynasty.

She was a poet and musician as well as being known for her beauty. She created a style of popular song known as the bawle and wrote court dramas such as Vijayakārī and Indavaṃsa.

== Early life ==
Ma Phwar was born in 1833 to the future King Tharrawaddy and Anauk Nanmadaw Ma Mya Lay. When her father ascended the throne, her mother became the Queen of the Western Palace, and Phwar was granted the appanage of Hlaing. She then became known as the Princess of Hlaing. At the Rajabiseka Consecration of her father in 1840, she received the title of Thiri Thu Myatswa Yadana Dewi from him.

She was said to have inherited her artistic skill from her mother, who was also a poet. When Anauk Nanmadaw Ma Mya Lay was executed by King Tharrawaddy in 1845, their daughter was adopted by Setkya Dewi, who later became the Chief Queen of King Mindon.

== Later years ==
The Princess of Hlaing married Crown Prince Kanaung on 11 July 1853, at the age of 20, and gave birth to a son known as the Prince of Htantabin. Her husband was assassinated during the unsuccessful Myingun Myinkhondaing rebellion of 1866, and her son was executed in 1878. She died on 31 December 1875.

== Art ==
=== Bawle and patpyoe ===
The Princess of Hlaing is regarded as the first composer of a kind of plaintive song known as the bawle. Popular bawles include "Seinchu Kya-nyaung", "Naga Saddan" and "Pandusela". She also composed a type of classical music set to drums called the patpyoe. "Yayyamone", a combination of three traditional lullabies, is her best known patpyoe.

=== Court drama ===
The Princess of Hlaing wrote two court dramas: Vijayakārī and Indavaṃsa. The full script of Vijayakārī is no longer available; only the fourth volume has survived.

== See also ==
- Konbaung dynasty
- List of Burmese consorts
