= Nagayon Pagoda =

Buddhist temple in Amarapura, Myanmar

Nagayon Temple
- နဂါးရုံဘုရား
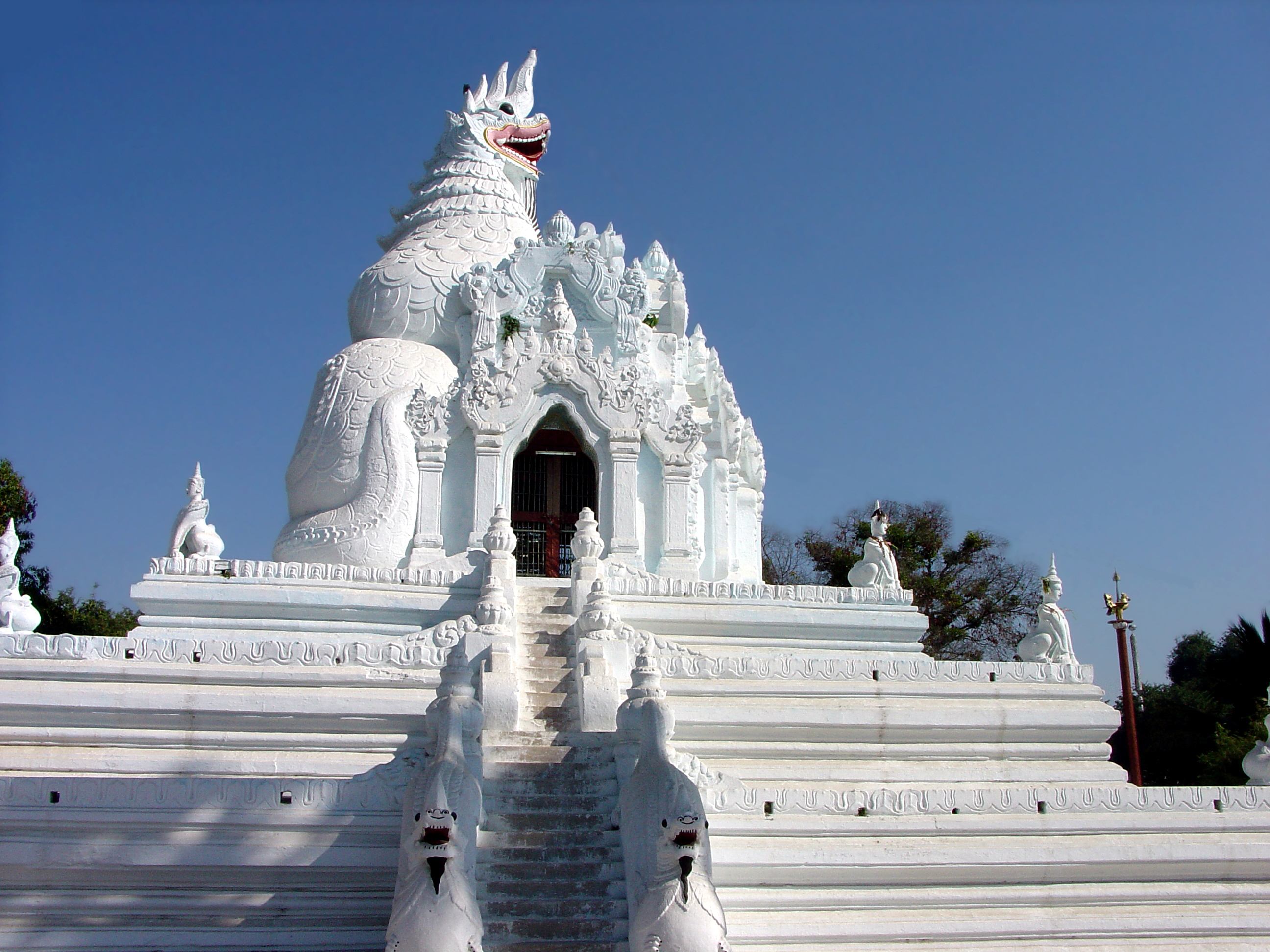

Religion
- Affiliation: Theravada Buddhism

Location
- Location: Amarapura, Mandalay Region
- Country: Myanmar
- Interactive map of Nagayon Temple
- Coordinates: 21.904374°N 96.051102°E

Architecture
- Founder: Anauk Nanmadaw Ma Mya Lay
- Completed: c. 1800s

Nagayon Pagoda (Burmese: နဂါးရုံဘုရား, also known as Nagayon Temple) is a Buddhist temple in Amarapura, a former royal capital in Mandalay Region, Myanmar (Burma). The temple was built by Anauk Nanmadaw Ma Mya Lay, the Queen of the Western Palace during the reign of Bagyidaw in the first half of the 1800s. The temple's exterior is known for its unusual design. The roof of the temple is draped with the naga Mucalinda, who is said in Buddhist mythology to have protected the Buddha from the elements while achieving enlightenment.

== Gallery ==
Nagayon Pagoda in a 19th-century painting.

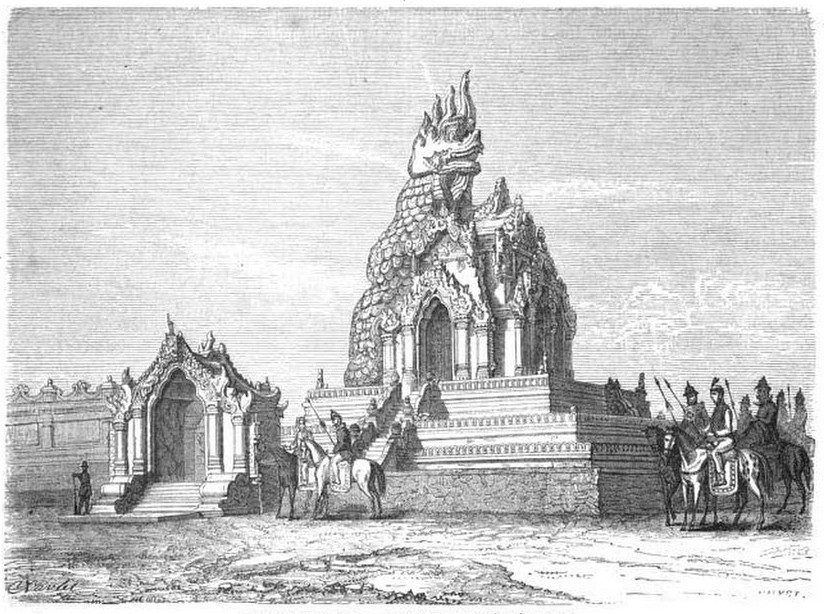
Nagayon Pagoda in a 19th-century painting.

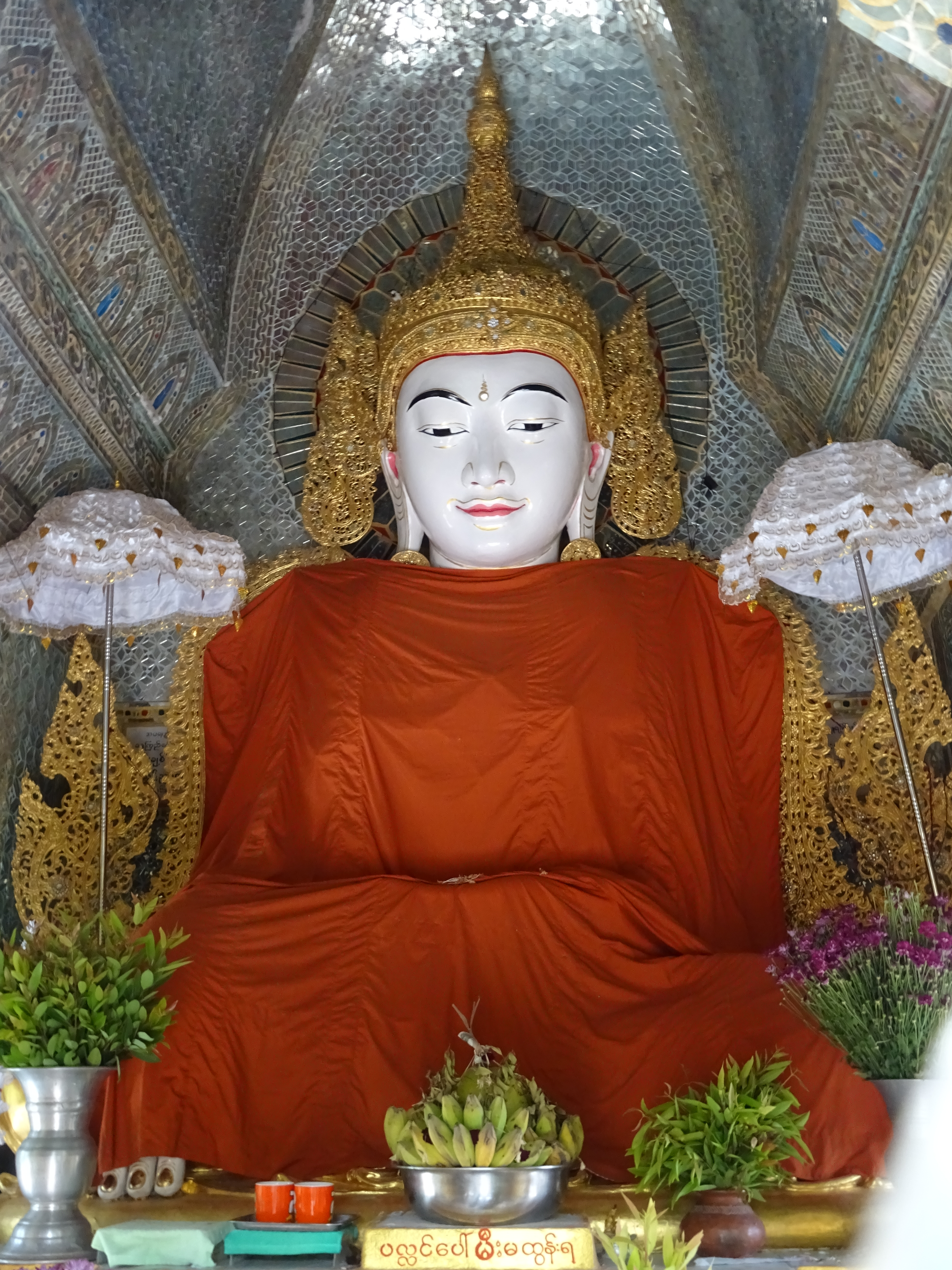
Buddha statue inside Nagayon Pagoda.

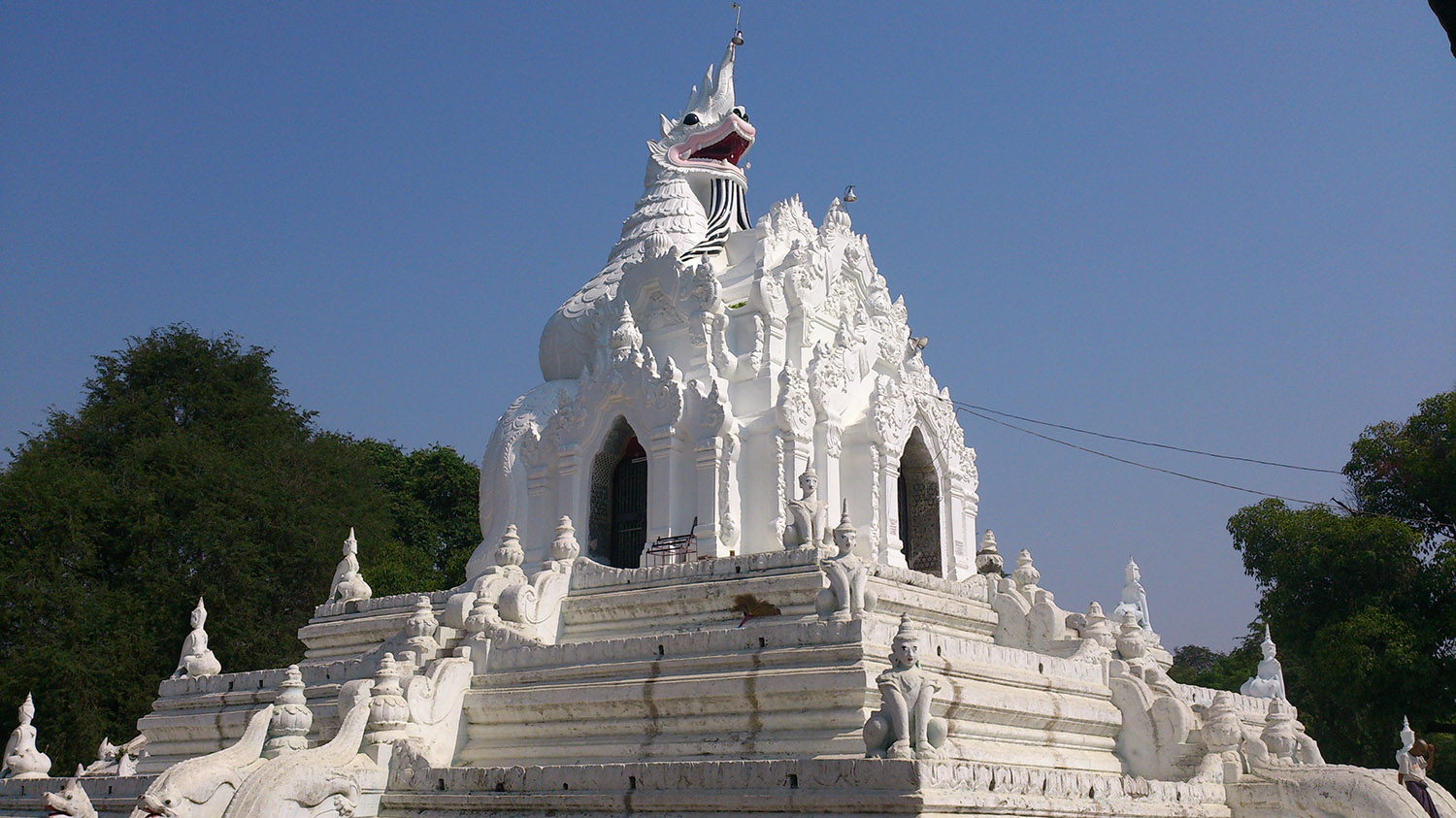
Nagayon Pagoda.

== See also ==
- Kyaung
