= Prince Myingun =

Burmese prince (1844–1921)

Myingun Prince
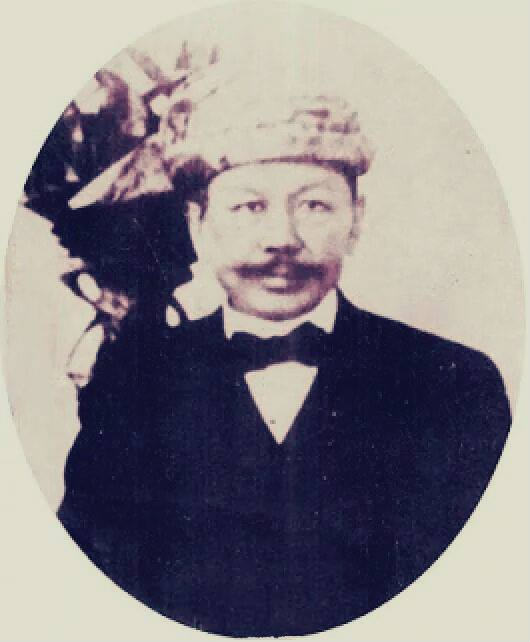
- Myingun Prince
- Born: Maung Myo Aye; 1844; Amarapura
- Died: September 20, 1921 (aged 76–77); Saigon, Vietnam
- Spouse: Meen Cho Bo, Princess of Taungnyo; Shin O Khinle Pya
Regnal name
- Thu Mahar Thiri Dhammaraja
- House: Konbaung
- Father: King Mindon
- Mother: Royal Queen of the Southern Gilded Chamber

Thu Mahar Thiri Dhammaraja (1844 – 20 September 1921), commonly known as Myingun Prince, was a royal prince during the late Konbaung dynasty. He is known for his role in the assassination of Crown Prince Kanaung in Myingun Myinkhondaing rebellion.

Prince Myingun is portrayed as a villain by Burmese historians because his assassination of his father-in-law Crown Prince Kanaung, the kingdom's leading reformist, crippled attempts to modernize Burma's army and other institutions.

== Early life ==
Myingun prince was born in 1844, before King Mindon ascended the throne, to Mindon prince and the Royal Queen of the Southern Gilded Chamber. His given name was Maung Myo Aye. He had a younger brother Myinkhondaing Prince.

He first conferred the title of Thilawa and later Thu Mahar Thiri Dhammaraja, and received the appanage of Myingun. (Note: Myingun is a town in Magway Region.) In 1858, he married his first cousin, Meen Cho Bo, Princess of Taungnyo, daughter of Crown Prince Kanaung, by his wife, Myauk-saung Shin Key. He also married to saungya kolouptaw Shin O and Khinle Pya, the widow of his younger brother, the Prince of Myingundaing.

== Rebellion and later life ==
On 2 August 1866, Crown Prince Kanaung was beheaded by the princes of Myingun and Myinkhondaing in a failed coup against his father, King Mindon at a cabinet meeting in the palace. King Mindon, however, managed to escape the assassination. A minister and some officials were killed along with Kanaung.

After the unsuccessful coup, the two brothers and their mother ran away to Myingyan and later to Yangon. The British Colonial government sent them to Port Blair of Andaman and Nicobar Islands and then to Kolkata, Chunar and Varanasi. Burma fell under colonial rule in 1886 and they left for Saigon, a French colony at the time. From there, he led anti-British movements among Burmese people and saophas in Shan State. He returned to Myanmar twice in secret to supervise the fight against the British.

His efforts were largely stymied when Britain and France signed an agreement in 1904 that brought the colonial powers closer together, the Entente Cordiale. He continued his fight against the British until his last days in Saigon.

He died on September 20, 1921, at the age of 77 in Saigon, Vietnam.
