= Kinwun Mingyi U Kaung =

Burmese politician (1822–1908)

Kinwun Mingyi U Kaung Duke of Lekaing
- ကင်းဝန်မင်းကြီး ဦးကောင်း
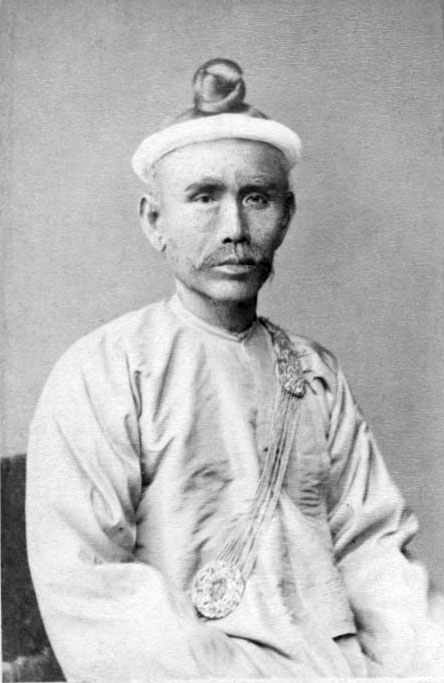
- Portrait by John Watkins, 1872

Member of the Legislative Council of Burma
- In office 1897–?
- Leader: Frederick William Richard Fryer
- Succeeded by: Position abolished
- Leader: King Mindon; King Thibaw
- Succeeded by: Position abolished

Prime Minister First Rank in Hluttaw
- In office ? – 29 November 1885
- Leader: King Thibaw
- Succeeded by: Position abolished

Personal details
- Born: Maung Chin; 3 February 1822 Madaingbin village, Konbaung dynasty
- Died: 30 June 1908 (aged 86) Fort Dufferin, Mandalay Division, Burma Province, British India British Indian (1885-1908)
- Spouse(s): Singyan Thakin; Shwe Me
- Children: 2 adopted sons
- Parent(s): U Hmo and Daw Si
- Education: Bagaya Monastery, Inwa
- Occupation: Civil servant
- Awards: Companions of the Order of the Star of India

Kinwun Mingyi U Kaung, Duke of Lekaing C.S.I. (Burmese: ကင်းဝန်မင်းကြီး ဦးကောင်း, also spelt U Gaung; 3 February 1822 – 30 June 1908) was a Burmese chief minister during the reigns of King Mindon and Thibaw, as well as a colonial civil servant. He attempted to westernise the Burmese kingdom's existing bureaucracy into a more democratic system. Because of such attempts to do so, he was accused by many as decoy to have allowed Britain to win the Third Anglo-Burmese War.

== Background ==
U Kaung was born Maung Chin (မောင်ချင်း) on 3 February 1822 (Sunday, 12th waxing of Tabodwe 1183 ME) in Madaingbin village (in the Lower Chindwin district). His father U Hmo was a foot soldier in the Natshinywe Infantry Regiment. As was customary tradition, he was destined to follow the footsteps of his father. However, he escaped conscription by ordaining as a Buddhist monk and was given the Dharma name Āloka (အာလောက). He moved to Amarapura and lived at Bagaya Monastery, the monastery of the Bagaya Sayadaw, then the Supreme Patriarch of the Konbaung dynasty. He was also schooled at a college led by U Yanwe, who eventually became the chief minister of King Mindon with the title Pakan Mingyi. He disrobed and returned to the laity at the age of 25.

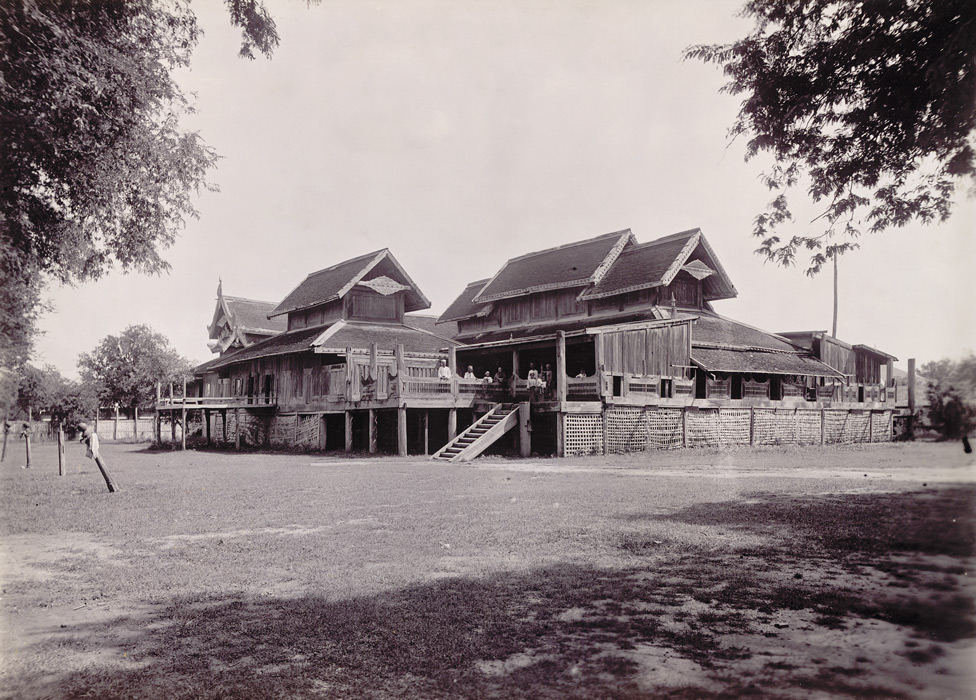
U Kaung's residence at Fort Dufferin (former Mandalay Palace) in 1903.

== Joining service ==
After the Second Anglo-Burmese War in 1853, he joined the court service of King Mindon (who had deposed his half brother, King Pagan), who renamed him U Kaung (ဦးကောင်း, lit. "good", considered more favorable than his birth name Chin) and appointed him the Clerk of the Royal Treasury (ရွှေတိုက်စာရေး) and received Ywathitgyi village as his appanage. In 1857, he was promoted to high clerk of Hluttaw (လွှတ်တော် စာရေးကြီးအရာ). In 1860, he was appointed as the Count of Ahlone. In 1871, he was appointed minister of third rank (ဝန်ထောက်) at the Hluttaw, the national governing body and was responsible for the country's police and customs stations, where he earned his moniker Kinwun (lit. 'minister of the patrol stations').

In 1871, he led the first Burmese diplomatic group to Europe and successfully asserted Burmese sovereignty. In preparation for the trip, he rose to the rank of Wungyi, the chief minister. There, he was received by Queen Victoria and invested Prince of Wales (later to be King Edward VII) and William Ewart Gladstone gold salwe of 21 and 18 strings respectively. he and his embassy, consisting of Shwe O (later the Kyaukmyaung Atwinwun) and Shwe Bin and Maung Mye (later the Debayin Wundauk). By 1872, he had risen to the rank of regional governor of Minhla District. In 1874, he was appointed as the minister of gun. From then on, he had to take on more responsibility in national defense and military affairs. The position of gun minister has the power to oversee the army and land forces. Then, in 1875, he was appointed as the Duke of Lekaing.

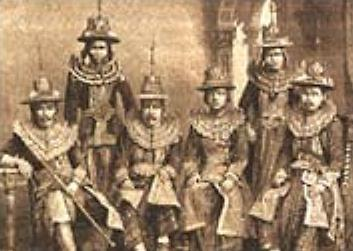
Burmese Embassy to France 1873 or 1874

Before King Mindon's death in 1878, U Kaung was made Commander-in-Chief. After King Mindon's death, Kinwun Mingyi lost much of his influence. He ordered the Burmese troops during the Third Anglo-Burmese War to not attack invading British. As U Kaung journeyed across the globe, he witnessed the might of the British military firsthand. When he implored King Thibaw at the royal court to avoid conflict with the British, Supayalat angrily says,

"This old man is always timid. He should wear a woman's htamein. Sent a htamein and a thanaka grinding stone to U Kaung's house this evening."

U Kaung's role in the initial collapse of Burmese resistance later gave rise to the popular mnemonic U Kaung lein htote, minzet pyouk ("U Kaung's treachery, end of dynasty", ဦးကောင်းလိမ်ထုတ် မင်းဆက်ပြုတ်), corresponding to Burmese Era 1247 or 1885 AD in Burmese numerology.

== British rule ==
Under British colonial rule, Kinwon Mingyi served as a civil servant in the British administration. In 1887, he was awarded the Companionship of the Order of the Star of India (CSI) and in 1897, he became one of the first two indigenous Burmese to be appointed to the Legislative Council of Burma.

During his civil service, he penned many famous books and poems in Burmese literature. Among them were the Attathamkhepa Wunnana Dhammathat (အဋသံခေပဝဏ္ဏနာဓမ္မသတ်) and the Digest of Buddhist Law. His personal library was acquired by the Bernard Free Library in Rangoon.

U Kaung was twice married. His first marriage was to the Princess of Singyan, one of the lesser queens of Pagan Min. His second was to Shwe Me, the daughter of the myothugyi (hereditary chief) of Ahlone, a town in Monywa Township. He did not have any biological children, but he adopted two sons of his brother-in-law (of his second wife).

He died of paralysis at his residence in Fort Dufferin in Mandalay on 30 June 1908.

== Bibliography ==
- Taw Sein Ko (1913). Burmese sketches. British Burma Press.
- Than Tun (2011). Short Essays on Burmese History (in Burmese) (compilation ed.). Yangon: Gangaw Myaing Sarpay.
- Burmese Encyclopedia Vol 2, p-406 printed in 1955
