= June Rose Bellamy =

First Lady of Myanmar

- ရတနာနတ်မယ်
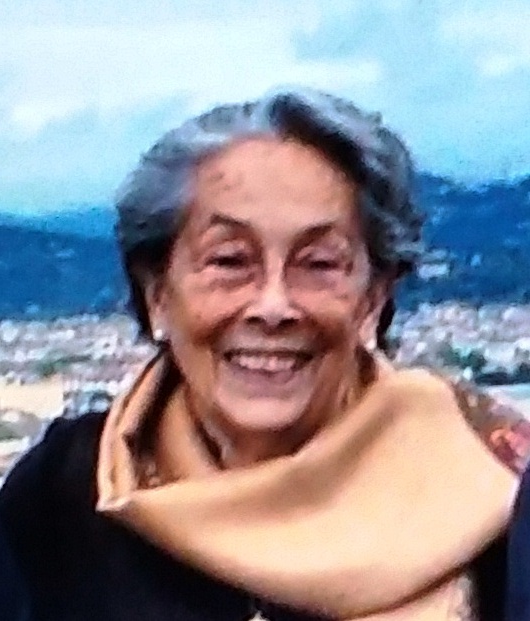
- Bellamy in 2015

First Lady of Myanmar
- In role 24 December 1976 – May 1977
- President: Ne Win
- Preceded by: Ni Ni Myint
- Succeeded by: Ni Ni Myint (remarried)

Personal details
- Born: Yadana Nat-Mei; 1 June 1932 Maymyo, Burma, British India
- Died: 1 December 2020 (aged 88) Florence, Italy
- Spouses: Mario Postiglione (div. 1954) Ne Win (m. 1976–1977)
- Children: 2
- Parent(s): Herbert Bellamy; Hteiktin Ma Lat
- Known for: great-granddaughter of Prince Kanaung Mintha, ex-wife of Ne Win

June Rose Bellamy, also Yadana Nat-Mei (Burmese: ရတနာနတ်မယ်; lit. Goddess of the Nine Jewels, 1 June 1932 – 1 December 2020) was the First Lady of Myanmar as the fourth wife of the 4th President of Burma Ne Win. She was a great-granddaughter of Crown Prince Kanaung.

== Early life and career ==
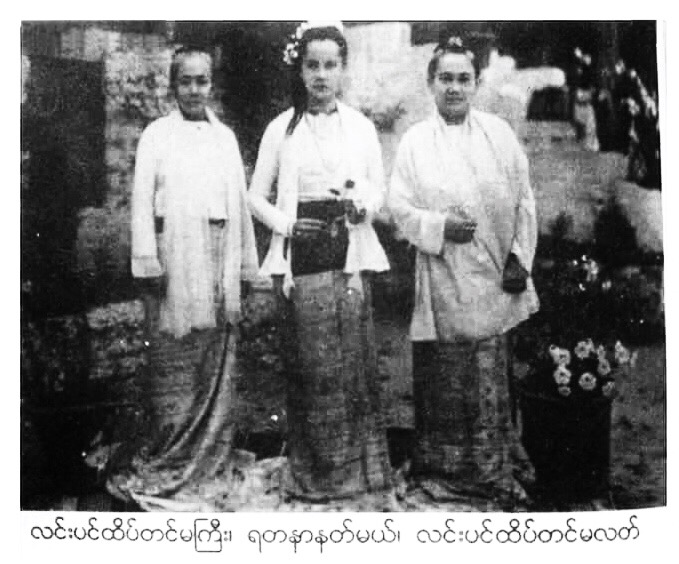
Hteiktin Ma Gyi, Yadana Nat-Mei and Hteiktin Ma Lat

June Rose was born on 1 June 1932 in Maymyo, British Burma as the sole child of Princess Hteiktin Ma Lat of the Konbaung dynasty and Herbert Bellamy, an Australian orchid collector long settled in Burma. She is a granddaughter of Prince Limbin. She was educated at St Joseph's Convent School, Kalimpong, India, also educated in Rangoon, Burma. After the war, as a teenager, she wrote an essay for a competition called "The World We Want", sponsored by the New York Herald Tribune, which won a prize to visit the US along with 30 international students. She became a TV host in the Philippines and took up painting.

June Rose was offered a female lead role in the war film The Purple Plain, as the young Burmese nurse who gives a suicidal pilot (played by Gregory Peck) an interest in life, but says she pulled out during the shooting in Ceylon. "It was so Hollywood, it was ridiculous; it was an insult to anything that had to do with Burma," she said.

== Marriage ==
=== First ===
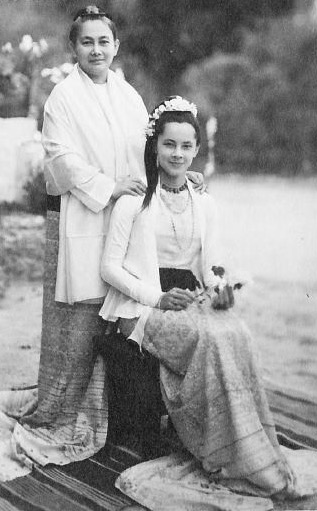
A young Yadana Nat Mei and her mother Princess Hteiktin Ma Lat

June Rose was first married to Mario Postiglione, a physician and Senior Malaria advisor of WHO in Rangoon, Damascus, Geneva and Manila. The couple divorced in 1954, after having two sons, Michele Bellamy Postiglione and Maurice Postiglione.

=== Second ===
In 1963 June Rose met Ne Win, Burma's new military ruler, in Europe, where she was living. Ne Win suggested she come back to Burma, but she was unwilling to leave Italy. On a later visit he proposed. They married in 1976, but the marriage lasted only five months. Ne Win accused her of being a CIA spy and divorced her.

== Later life and death ==
After she returned to Italy, June Rose taught International and Italian cooking in Florence, as well as carrying on charitable work, through Rangoon-based doctors, putting young Burmese students through medical school. She has since written cookbooks, including The Soul of Spice, featured at the 2017 Turin Book Fair.

June Rose died on 1 December 2020 at the age of 88.

== In popular culture ==
- Yadana Nat-Mei is the subject of Than Win Hlaing's historic book Yadana Nat-Mei or once First Lady, first published in 2015.
- According to her son Michele Postiglione Bellamy, June Rose completed her memoirs before her death which is expected to be published in June 2021.
- A documentary film about her life called Rhapsody in June is in the works.

Honorary titles
Preceded by Ni Ni Myint	First Lady of Myanmar; 1976–1977	Succeeded by Ni Ni Myint
