= Kanaung Mintha =

Kanaung Mintha ကနောင်မင်းသား
- Viceroy of Konbaung, Prince of Kanaung
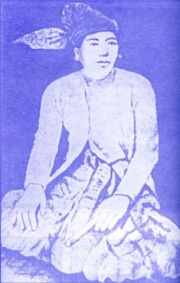

Viceroy of Burma
- Tenure: 18 February 1853 – 2 August 1866
- Coronation: 11 June 1853
- Predecessor: Pagan
- Successor: Thibaw
- Monarch: Mindon Min
- Born: 5 September 1819; Amarapura
- Died: 2 August 1866 (aged 46); Mandalay
- Burial: Sandamuni Pagoda, Mandalay Hill
- Spouse: 18 wives in total, including Hlaing Hteik Khaung Tin, Crown Princess
- Issue: 20 sons, 15 daughters
Names
- Maung Kauk
- House: Konbaung
- Father: Tharrawaddy
- Mother: Me Nu, Queen of South Palace
- Religion: Theravada Buddhism

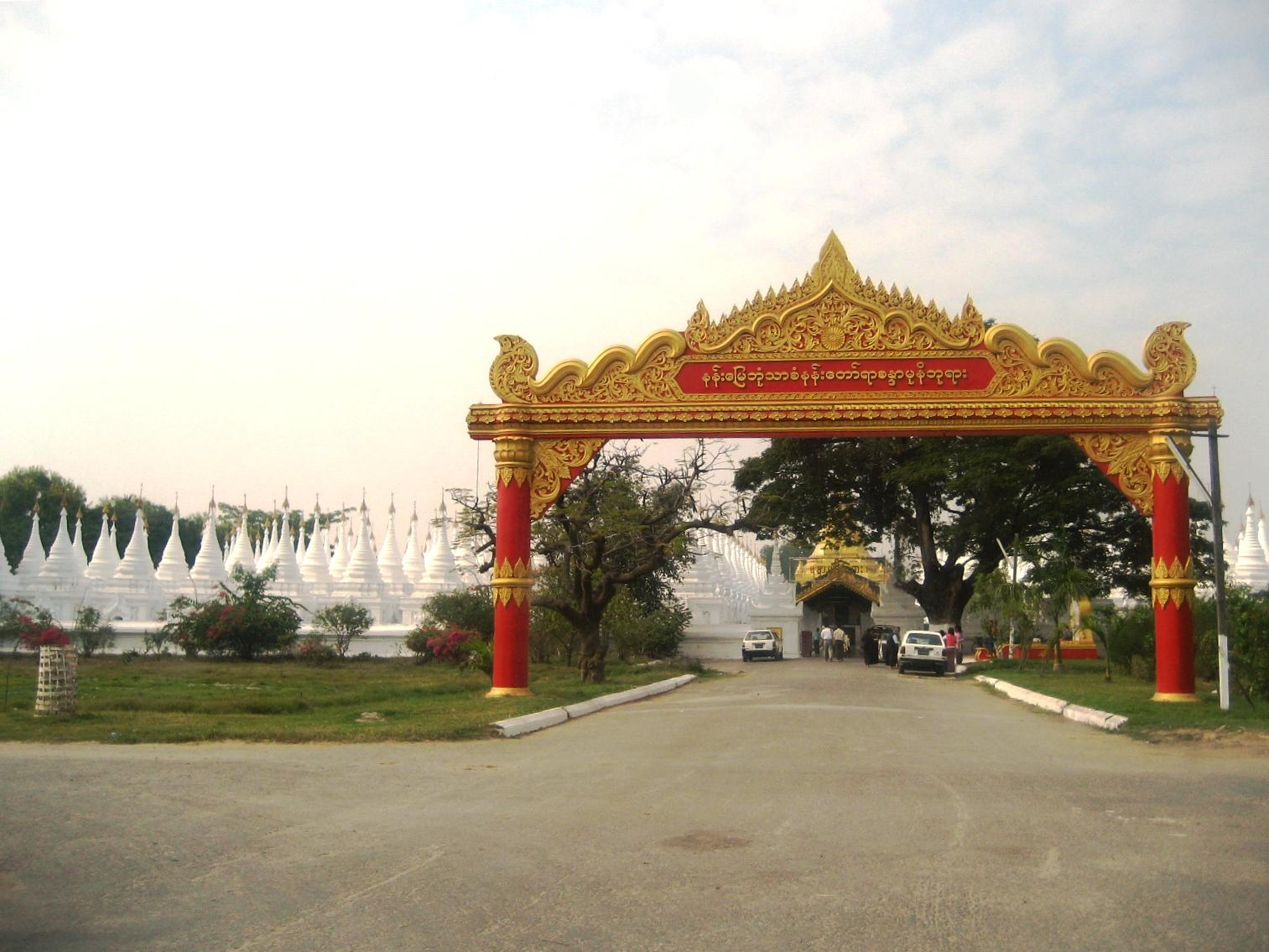
Sandamuni Pagoda where Crown Prince Ka Naung lies buried at the foot of Mandalay Hill

Kanaung Mintha (Burmese: ကနောင်မင်းသား; 31 January 1820 – 2 August 1866) was crown prince of Burma and son of King Tharrawaddy and younger brother of King Mindon of Burma. He overthrew the king Pagan Min in 1853 with his brother Mindon and served as heir apparent and modernising influence until his assassination in 1866.

== Early life ==
Kanaung Mintha was born to King Tharrawaddy and the Kyaukmaw queen consort (later Queen Chandra Mata Mahay) in the palace of Amarapura. He was born with the style Thado Minye Kyawhtin in September 1819 (1181 Myanmar Era, Tawtalin Waxing 2). He was given the personal name Taung Min, reflecting his birth in the new South Hall of the Amarapura Palace. Upon coming of age, he was given the town of Mindat as its myoza and receiving the title Mindat Min. After the accession of King Pagan Min in 1846, he was reassigned governorship to the town of Kanaung.

Towards the end of the Second Anglo-Burmese War, Kanaung and Mindon overthrew their half brother Pagan (1848–1853); Mindon ascended the throne and Kanaung became the Heir Apparent on 11 July 1853. He was the fiery "War Prince" and the peoples' idol. Kanaung attempted to modernize the country by sending scholars to Western countries and by founding an arms industry. However, his efforts were cut short when he was killed by his two nephews. Notwithstanding his short life, he is revered by Burmese nationals for his innovations in modernizing Burma.

== Role as a modernizer ==
King Mindon was dedicated to religion, but Kanaung was skillful in administration, serving as the leader (သမ္မတ, thamada) of the Hluttaw, the kingdom's administrative body. Under Kanaung's guidance, the following reforms were undertaken: centralization of the kingdom's internal administration, introduction of a salary system for the bureaucracy (to dampen the authority and income of bureaucrats), fixed judicial fees, comprehensive penal laws, reorganization of the financial system, removal of trade barriers including custom duties, reform of the thathameda taxes (to increase direct taxation), and modernization of the kingdom's army and introduction of new police forces.

Kanaung tried to rebuild the Burmese Army with modern weapons. He sent men to study in Western countries to establish an up-to-date arms industry. His efforts were well depicted in contemporary stories and poems. One story relates to his effort in testing depth charges in order to repulse British troops sailing up the Irrawaddy. Eventually, these testings were thwarted by the head of the Buddhist Sangha who protested against them by asserting their harmful effects on aquatic life. Another story tells about his visits to the factories on cold early winter mornings wrapped in a blanket. He was also known for his waywardness as depicted in a famous love song called Seinchu Kya-nyaung bawlè written by his wife, Princess Hlaing Hteik Khaung Tin.

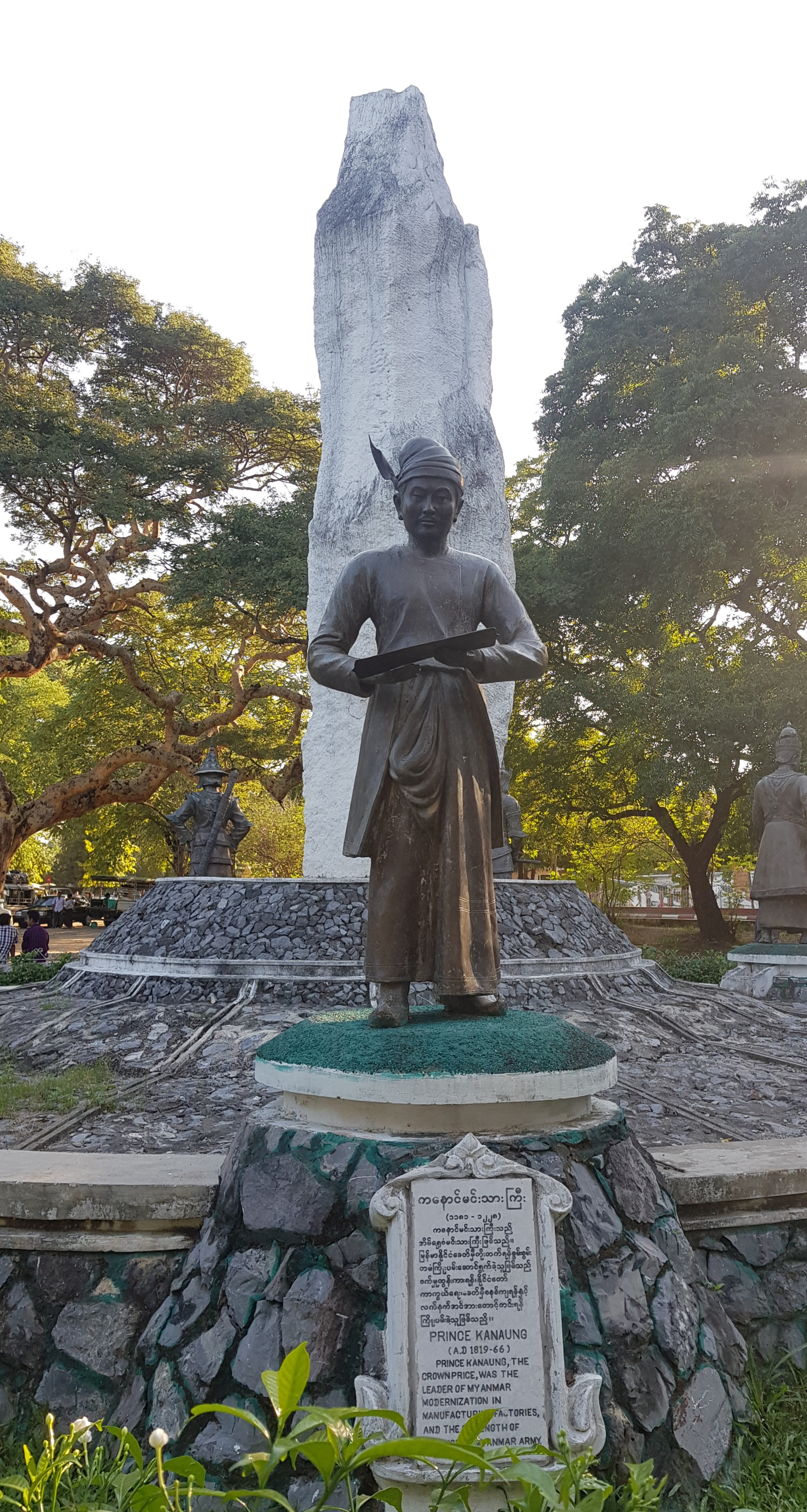
Statue in Mandalay Palace

== Assassination ==
In an unsuccessful palace coup on 2 August 1866, Kanaung Mintha was beheaded by the princes Myingun and Myinkhondaing (sons of King Mindon), at the Hluttaw (People's Assembly), killed along with 3 of his sons. Nevertheless, he managed to hold off the assassins to gain enough time for the King's escape. Kanaung's eldest son, the Padein Prince fled to Shwebo and launched a rebellion against Mindon. It became one of the most serious uprisings the Konbaung dynasty had ever faced, nearly toppling King Mindon's reign. However, Royal forces defeated the revolt, and Padein was captured 6 October. He was executed in 1867 for his part in another alleged plot.

Upon his death, he was conferred the royal title Thiri Pawara Maha Dhamma Yaza, nominally reserved for kings, as part of a yadaya ritual to "substitute" for Mindon's death. From almost a year (4 August 1866 to 6 June 1867), Kanaung's corpse was displayed in the middle of a temporary ceremonial palace (during the time, Mindon had relocated to a temporary palace as a form of yadaya, owing to a prophecy that claimed a king would be lost in BE 1228. Kanaung, by assassination, had 'fulfilled' this prophecy and was thus entitled proper rites reserved for a monarch.) His body was buried in the grounds of the Sandamuni Pagoda, built in his memory at the foot of Mandalay Hill by Mindon.

In 1878, King Mindon died and his son Prince Thibaw acceded to the throne. In November 1885, King Thibaw surrendered to the British after the defeat at Third Anglo-Burmese War. Consequently, Thibaw was sent to exile in India. To this day, Burmese citizens believe that their history would have been considerably different if Kanaung had survive and ascended the Burmese throne. The loss of Kanaung Mintha has been mourned by the Burmese nearly as much as that of Aung San. In addition, Burmese people believe British officers were behind the assassination plot of Aung San and Kanaung.

== Epilogue ==
In 1978 Ne Win, dictator of Burma since leading a military coup in 1962, married June Rose Bellamy, aka Yadana Nat-Me (Precious Angel), a great-granddaughter of Ka Naung, daughter of Princess Hteiktin Ma Lat and Herbert Bellamy, an Australian orchid collector long settled in Burma. The marriage lasted only a few months and ended in divorce.

Kanaung Mintha Konbaung Dynasty Born: 31 January 1820 Died: 2 August 1866
Royal titles
Preceded by Pagan	Heir to the Burmese Throne as Prince of Kanaung; 11 July 1853 – 2 August 1866	Succeeded by Thibaw
