= Tharrawaddy Min =

King of Burma (r. 1837–46)

Tharrawaddy Min သာယာဝတီမင်း

King of Burma
- Reign: 30 April 1837 – 17 November 1846
- Coronation: 8 July 1840
- Predecessor: Bagyidaw
- Successor: Pagan Min
- Born: Maung Khin; 14 March 1787; Wednesday, 11th waning of Tabaung 1148 ME; Amarapura
- Died: 17 November 1846 (aged 59); Tuesday, 14th waning of Tazaungmon 1208 ME; Amarapura
- Burial: Amarapura
- Spouse: Me Myat Shwe; 96 queens in total
- Issue: 18 sons and 18 daughters including: Pagan; Mindon; Kanaung; Setkya Dewi
Regnal name
- Siri Pavarāditya Lokadhipati Vijaya Mahādhammarājadhirāja (သိရီပဝရာဒိတျ လောကာဓိပတိ ဝိဇယမဟာဓမ္မရာဇာဓိရာဇာ)
- House: Konbaung
- Father: Thado Minsaw
- Mother: Min Kye, Princess of Taungdwin
- Religion: Theravada Buddhism

Tharrawaddy Min (Burmese: သာယာဝတီမင်း, pronounced [θàjàwədì mɪ́ɰ̃]; 14 March 1787 – 17 November 1846) was the 8th king of the Konbaung Dynasty of Burma. He repudiated the Treaty of Yandabo and almost went to war with the British.

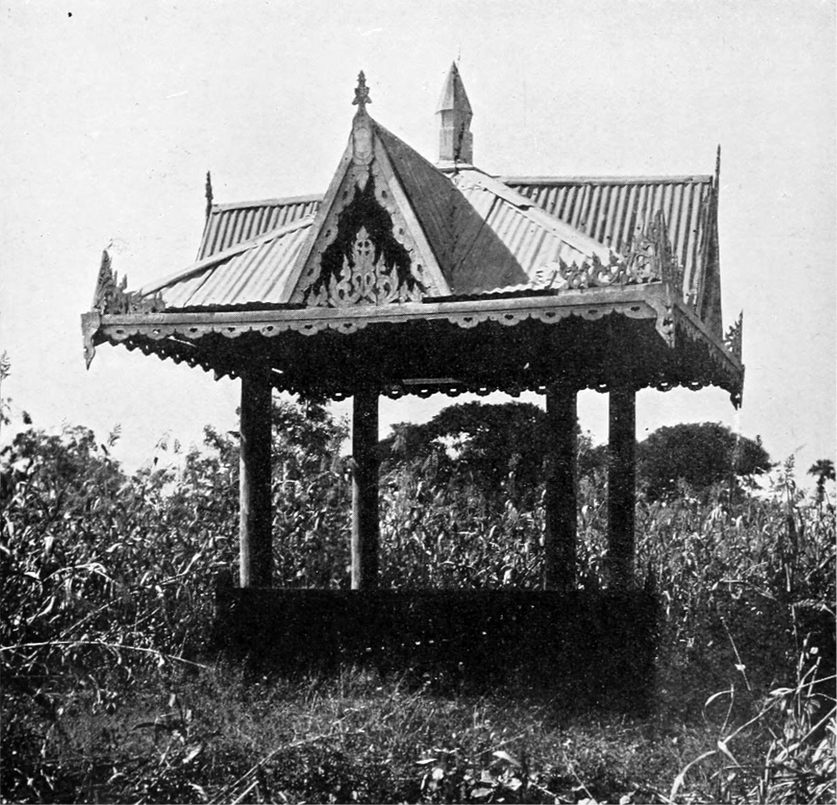
Tharrawaddy Min's tomb.

== Brief ==
Tharrawaddy was born Maung Khin to Crown Prince Thado Minsaw (son of King Bodawpaya) and Princess Min Kye on 14 March 1787. (Note: He was born on in the early hours of Wednesday, the 11th waning of Tabaung 1148 ME (14 March 1787).) When his elder brother Bagyidaw ascended the throne in 1819, Tharrawaddy was appointed Heir Apparent. As crown prince, he fought in the First Anglo-Burmese War. In February 1837, he raised the standard of rebellion after escaping to Shwebo, the ancestral place of the Konbaung kings. Tharrawaddy succeeded in overthrowing Bagyidaw who abdicated on 30 April 1837. (Note: 12th waning of Kason 1199 ME (30 April 1837)) Tharrawaddy ascended the throne on the same day. Princess Min Myat Shwe, a granddaughter of Hsinbyushin, whom he married in 1809, was crowned as his chief queen (Nanmadaw Mibaya Hkaungyi).

In 1841, King Tharrawaddy donated a 42-ton bell called the Maha Tissada Gandha Bell and 20 kilograms (44 lb) of goldplating to the Shwedagon Pagoda in Yangon. His reign was rife with rumours of preparations for another war with the British who had added the Arakan and Tenasserim to their dominions. Tharrawaddy died on 17 November 1846. (Note: 14th waning of Tazaungmon 1208 ME (17 November 1846))

It was, however, not until 1852, after Tharrawaddy was succeeded by his son Pagan Min, that the Second Anglo-Burmese War broke out.

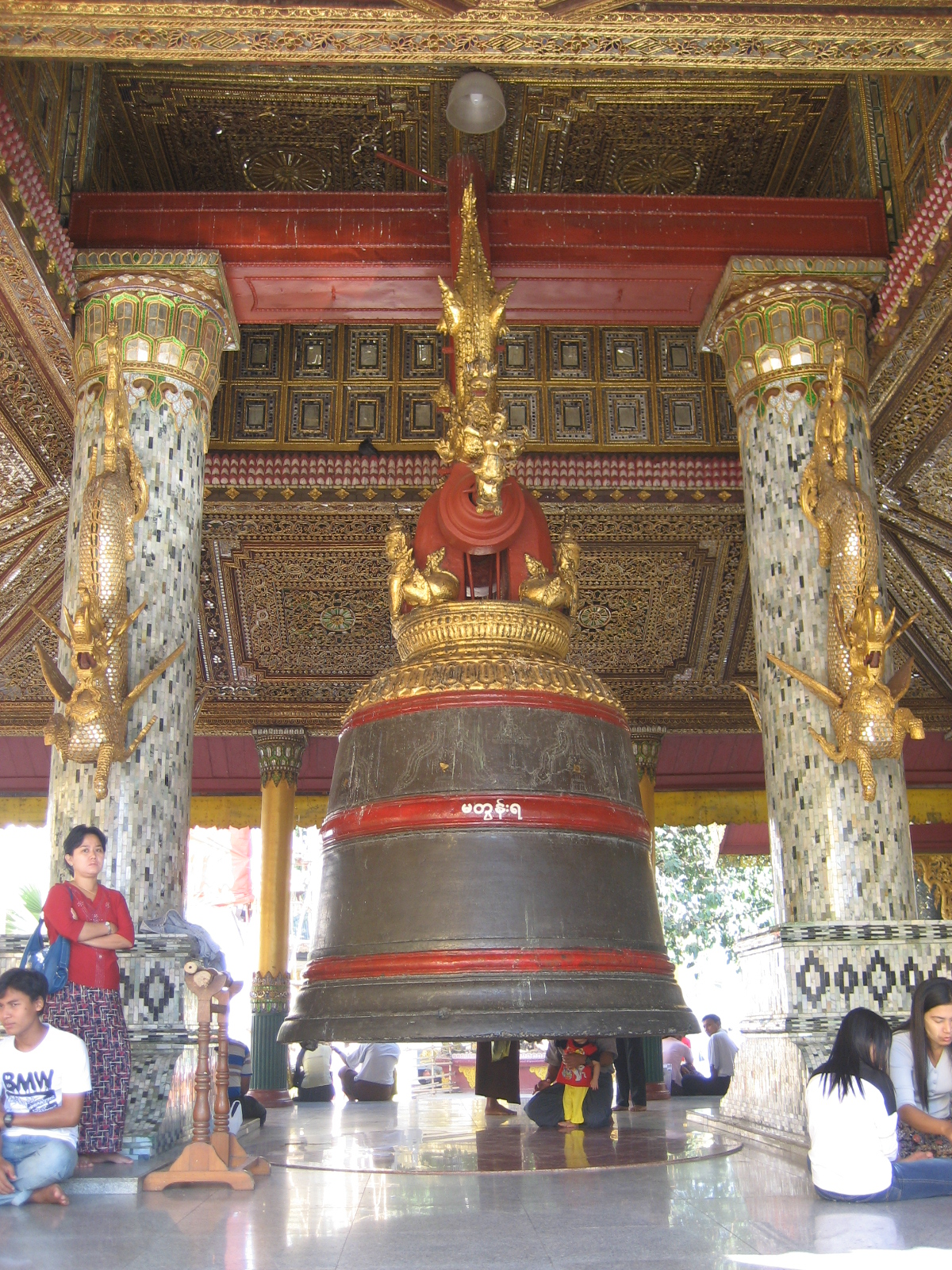
The Maha Tissada Gandha Bell donated by Tharrawaddy Min can be seen hung in a pavilion on the northeast terrace of the Shwedagon Pagoda in Yangon.

== Bibliography ==
- Maung Maung Tin, U (2004) [1905]. Konbaung Set Maha Yazawin (in Burmese). Vol. 1–3. Yangon: Department of Universities History Research, University of Yangon.

Tharrawaddy Min Konbaung Dynasty Born: 14 March 1787 Died: 17 November 1846
Regnal titles
Preceded by Bagyidaw	King of Burma; 30 April 1837 – 17 November 1846	Succeeded by Pagan
Royal titles
Preceded by Bagyidaw	Heir to the Burmese Throne as Prince of Tharrawaddy; 5 June 1819 – 30 April 1837	Succeeded by Pagan
