= Pagan Min =

King of Konbaung, Prince of Pagan

Pagan Min ပုဂံမင်း
- King of Konbaung, Prince of Pagan, Pagan King

King of Burma
- Reign: 17 November 1846 – 18 February 1853
- Coronation: 27 February 1847
- Predecessor: Tharrawaddy
- Successor: Mindon
- Born: Maung Htin; 21 June 1811; Amarapura
- Died: 14 March 1880 (aged 68); Mandalay
- Burial: Mandalay
- Consort: Min Shwe Kyu (Burmese:မင်းရွှေကြူ); 18 queens in total
Names
- Siri Sudhamma Tilokapavara Mahādhammarājadhirāja သိရီသုဓမ္မ တိလောကပဝရ မဟာဓမ္မရာဇာဓိရာဇာ
- House: Konbaung
- Father: Tharrawaddy
- Mother: Me Myat Shwe, Princess of Taungoo
- Religion: Theravada Buddhism

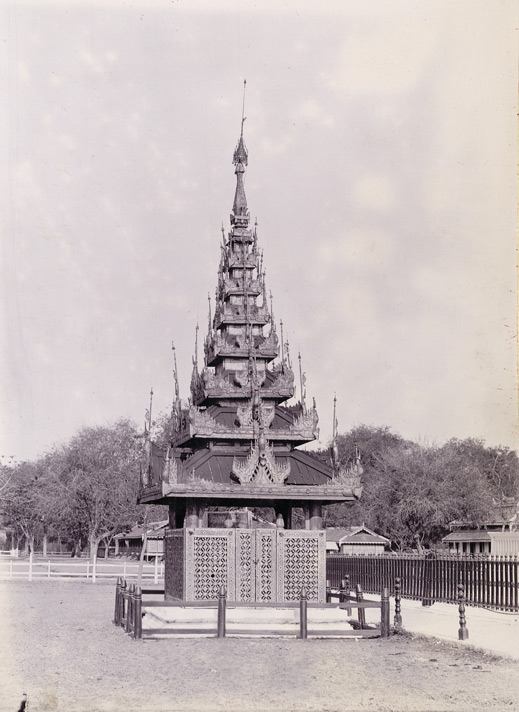

Pagan Min (Burmese: ပုဂံမင်း, pronounced [bəɡàɰ̃ mɪ́ɰ̃]; 21 June 1811 – 14 March 1880), was the ninth king of the Konbaung dynasty of Burma. Born Maung Biddhu Khyit, he was granted the title of Prince of Pagan by his father Tharrawaddy in August 1842. Pagan Min became king when Tharrawaddy died on 17 November 1846, with the formal title of His Majesty "Sri Pawara Vijaya Nanda Jatha Maha Dharma Rajadhiraja Pagan Min Taya-gyi".

Pagan Min won the power struggle to succeed his father by having his rival brothers killed. His chief ministers Maung Baing Zat and Maung Bhein enriched themselves by executing rich subjects.

The Second Anglo-Burmese War broke out during the reign of Pagan Min. In 1851 the governor of Pegu, Maung Ok, charged the captains of two British merchant ships with murder, embezzlement, and evasion of custom duties. He fined them 500 rupees, and required their debts be paid before being authorized to return to Kolkata. After receiving their complaints, Lord Dalhousie, the governor-general of British India, sent Commodore George Lambert to the king requesting a compensation of £920 and the dismissal of Maung Ok. Pagan complied by replacing Maung Ok. But on 6 January 1852, when the new governor declined to meet with a British delegation because Lambert had seized a Burmese royal ship, all British subjects were evacuated and the coast of Rangoon was placed under a blockade. Within days, Lambert's warships were bombarding Rangoon. On 7 February, Pagan wrote to Dalhousie to protest against the bombardment. On 13 February, Dalhousie sent an ultimatum to the king, demanding an equivalent of £100,000 as compensation for "having had to prepare for war", to be paid by 1 April. The ultimatum expired with no reply from Pagan, and a few days later, British troops entered Burmese territory and quickly routed Pagan's forces. Britain annexed the province of Pegu in December.

Pagan Min's half brother Mindon opposed the war; he fled with his brother Kanaung to Shwebo and raised the standard of rebellion. After a few weeks of fighting, Pagan's chief minister Magwe Mingyi went over to Mindon's side and Pagan Min abdicated on 18 February 1853, in favour of Mindon. Mindon allowed Pagan to live, and released all the European prisoners. Mindon sued for peace with the British but refused to sign a treaty ceding Burmese territory.

Pagan Min died of smallpox on 14 March 1881, during the reign of King Thibaw.

== Bibliography ==
- Charney, Michael W. (2006). Powerful Learning: Buddhist Literati and the Throne in Burma's Last Dynasty, 1752–1885. Ann Arbor: University of Michigan.
- Richard Cobden (1853). How wars are got up in India: The origin of the Burmese War. University of Michigan Libraries.
- Maung Maung Tin, U (2004) [1905]. Konbaung Set Yazawin (in Burmese). Vol. 1–3. Yangon: Department of Universities History Research, University of Yangon.

Pagan Min Konbaung Dynasty Born: 21 June 1811 Died: 14 March 1880
Regnal titles
Preceded by Tharrawaddy	King of Burma; 17 November 1846 – 18 February 1853	Succeeded by Mindon
Royal titles
Preceded by Tharrawaddy	Heir to the Burmese Throne as Prince of Pagan; August 1842 – 17 November 1846	Succeeded by Kanaung
