= List of populated places affected by the 2025 Myanmar earthquake =

On March 28, 2025, at approximately 12:50 PM local time, a 7.7-magnitude earthquake impacted central Myanmar, with its epicenter located close to Mandalay, the second-largest city of Myanmar. A strong 6.7-magnitude aftershock followed approximately eleven minutes following the initial tremor. The earthquake affected a wide area across Southeast Asia, with significant damage reported across the rest of Myanmar and in Thailand.

Communication networks and electrical infrastructure in Myanmar suffered significant damage, complicating assessment and relief efforts. Many residents in affected areas, particularly in Mandalay, were forced to evacuate their homes and sleep outdoors due to fears of aftershocks and unstable buildings. In Thailand, Prime Minister of Thailand Paetongtarn Shinawatra issued a declaration deeming Bangkok as an "emergency area" and urged residents to evacuate tall buildings as a precaution against aftershocks. The city's mass transit systems, including the elevated Skytrain and subway, were temporarily closed following the earthquake. Videos captured dramatic scenes of water surging from rooftop swimming pools atop high-rise buildings throughout the city.

== Populated places ==
=== Myanmar ===
City/Town	Region	Reported Casualties	Notes	References
Sagaing	Sagaing Region	50+ dead, 300+ injured, 900+ trapped	Part of officially declared emergency zone	
Mandalay	Mandalay Region	907 dead	Second-largest city in Myanmar, near epicenter; 50% of structures destroyed or heavily damaged, including Mandalay International Airport, Mandalay University, Mandalay Palace, Mandalay Central Prison and the Mahamuni Pagoda	
Inwa	Mandalay Region	Unknown casualties	Historic buildings damaged (including the Maha Aungmye Bonzan Monastery and the Four-Storied Monastery)	
Singu Township	Mandalay Region	50+ dead	30 killed in mine collapse	
Madaya	Mandalay Region	Unknown	Several buildings collapsed	
Kyaukse	Mandalay Region	170 dead, 732 injured	49 killed in school collapse	
Kanbalu	Sagaing Region	No major casualties reported	Several residential and religious buildings collapsed	
Chaung-U Township	Sagaing Region	None reported	Historic buildings damaged	
Monywa	Sagaing Region	Unknown	Located approximately 50km west of the epicenter	
Bagan	Mandalay Region	Unknown	Damage to historical sites recorded	
Pyawbwe	Mandalay Region	400 dead, 1,000 injured	Most homes collapsed	
Shwebo	Sagaing Region	4 dead		
Meiktila	Mandalay Region	44 dead, 166 injured		
Bone Oe	Mandalay Region	More than 100 dead	Estimates of casualties in rural Meiktila township village	
Wundwin	Mandalay Region	65 dead	Experienced shaking	
Yamethin	Mandalay Region	216 dead	13 killed in school collapse	
Naypyidaw	Naypyidaw Union Territory	At least 300 dead.	Capital city with reported structural damage.	
Zabuthiri Township	Naypyidaw Union Territory	204+ dead	Part of Naypyidaw numbers.	
Pyinmana	Naypyidaw Union Territory	At least 86 dead.	Part of Naypyidaw numbers	
Aungban	Shan State	3+ dead, 25+ trapped	Casualties from collapsing hotel	
Momeik	Shan State	Unknown	Experienced shaking	
Pindaya	Shan State	Unknown	Significant damage reported to Pindaya Monastery, a historic Buddhist monastery	
Nyaungshwe	Shan State	60+ dead	Electrocution and drowning fatalities included	
Kayla and Zayatgyi	Shan State	46+ dead, 950+ houses lost	Villages on Inle Lake	
Taungoo	Bago Region	At least 19 dead	Casualties reported from school and partial mosque collapse	
Taw Kyaung Pauk	Bago Region	2 dead	Houses collapsed	
Waing Kyun	Bago Region	None reported	Damage to farms and buildings, including a pagoda and cemetery	
Pyu	Bago Region	At least 4 dead	from reports of one house collapsing	
Yangon	Yangon Region	None reported	Experienced strong tremors, damage to power station causing intermittent power outages.	
Bago	Bago Region	Unknown	Experienced shaking	
Kalay	Magway Region	Unknown	Experienced shaking	
Muse	Shan State	Unknown	Experienced shaking	
Pathein	Ayeyarwady Region	None	Experienced shaking. Electric generators and water infrastructure disabled.	

=== Thailand ===
City/Town	Province	Reported Casualties	Notes	References
Bangkok	Bangkok	At least 17 dead, hundreds missing or trapped	Located approximately 600 miles from epicenter	
Phuket	Phuket	Unknown	Experienced tremors, Prime Minister was visiting	
Chiang Mai	Chiang Mai	Unknown	Northern Thai region experienced significant tremors	
Mae Hong Son	Mae Hong Son	Unknown	Northern Thai region experienced significant tremors	
Pattaya	Chonburi	Unknown	Coastal city approximately 60 miles south of Bangkok	
Uttaradit	Uttaradit	Unknown	Experienced tremors from the earthquake	
Nan	Nan	Unknown	Experienced tremors from the earthquake	

=== China ===
City/Town	Province	Reported Casualties	Notes	References
Ruili	Yunnan	2 injured	Border city with Myanmar, experienced structural damage	
Mangshi	Yunnan	None	City 100km northeast of Ruili, reports of shaking so strong people were unable to stand	
Kunming	Yunnan	None	Provincial capital of Yunnan, experienced over 10 seconds of shaking	
Dali	Yunnan	None	Tourist city located at the Tibetan plateau's Yunnan foothills	
Various settlements	Sichuan	None	Tremors felt	
Various settlements	Guizhou	None	Tremors felt	
Various settlements	Guangxi	None	Tremors felt	

=== Vietnam ===
City/Town	Region	Reported Casualties	Notes	References
Hanoi	Red River Delta	None	Capital city felt tremors from the earthquake	
Ho Chi Minh City	Southeast	1 dead	Tremors resulted in the evacuation of several buildings	

=== Laos ===
City/Town	Prefecture	Reported Casualties	Notes	References
Vientiane	Vientiane Prefecture	None	Capital city felt tremors, resulting in the evacuation of several buildings	

=== India ===
City/Town	State	Reported Casualties	Notes	References
New Delhi	Delhi	None	Tremors caused people to evacuate buildings	
Kolkata	West Bengal	None	Tremors felt in the city	
Imphal	Manipur	None	Earthquake felt strongly, causing evacuation	
Basirhat	West Bengal	None	Residents reported the shaking of natural water bodies	
Guwahati	Assam	None	Earthquake felt across the state of Assam, including Guwahati	

== Structures and infrastructure ==
=== In Myanmar ===
According to the official data released by the State Administration Council on April 13, 2025, over 9,600 religious buildings were destroyed due to the earthquake. This includes 5,402 pagodas, 3,841 monasteries, 187 nun monasteries, 136 mosques, 50 churches, 26 Hindu temples, and 1 Chinese temple.

Structure	City/Town	Type	Notes	References
Hsinbyume Pagoda	Mingun	Religious building	Largely destroyed	
Mingun Pahtodawgyi	Mingun	Religious building	Damage sustained	
Min Lan Mosque	Sagaing	Mosque	Collapsed, feared to have trapped 100 people.	
Myodaw Mosque	Sagaing	Mosque	Collapsed, 200+ killed	
Myoma Mosque	Sagaing	Mosque	Collapsed, 200+ killed	
Masjid Jamae	Sagaing	Mosque	Collapsed, 200+ killed	
Sagaing nunnery	Sagaing	Religious building	Structural collapse, principal of nunnery school killed, 100+ injured	
Zinaydaya monastery	Sagaing	Religious building	Structural collapse, trapping 600+	
Laykyun Myay Ot monastery	Sagaing	Religious building	Structural collapse, trapping 300+	
Myat Sing Kyaw monastery	Sagaing	Religious building	Structural collapse, trapping people	
Tipitaka Maha Gandawin Nikaya monastery	Sagaing	Religious building	Structural collapse, trapping people	
Umin Thonze Pagoda	Sagaing	Religious building	Damage, some structural collapse, 5 killed	
Umin Koeze Pagoda	Sagaing	Religious building	Structural collapse	
Zedi Hla	Sagaing	Religious building	Structural collapse	
Kaunghmudaw Pagoda	Sagaing	Religious building	Structural damage	
Sun U Ponnyashin Pagoda	Sagaing	Religious building	Structural collapse, 6 killed	
Ava Bridge	Sagaing/Inwa	Transportation infrastructure	Collapsed into Irrawaddy River	
Dokhtawaddy Bridge	Mandalay	Transportation infrastructure	Collapse with significant structural damage	
Mandalay International Airport	Mandalay	Airport	Ceilings collapsed, damage reported in the basement	
Mandalay University	Mandalay	University	Several buildings collapsed and/or caught fire with students and faculty trapped inside during exams	
Sky Villa Condo	Mandalay	Apartment building	Ten story building with lower six stories crushed in collapse.	
Shwe Pho Shein Mosque	Mandalay	Mosque	19th century historic building; 11 people killed, 3 injured, 4 trapped	
Taung Sin Kyone Mosque	Mandalay	Mosque	Many casualties and structural collapse	
St. Joseph's Church (Mandalay)	Mandalay	Church	Structural collapse	
Masoeyein Monastery	Mandalay	Religious building	Clock tower toppled, main building collapsed, several monks injured	
U Hla Thein Hall	Mandalay	Religious building	Over 100 monks trapped following the collapse of the hall	
Mahamuni Pagoda	Mandalay	Religious building	Suffered significant structural damage	
Ayeik Ma Htwet Pagoda	Mandalay	Religious building	Structural damage, collapse	
Kuthodaw Pagoda	Mandalay	Religious building	Damage, door collapse	
Mandalay Palace	Mandalay	Historic site	Gaping hole in several sections of surrounding wall	
Two-story tea shop	Maha Aung Myay, Mandalay	Commercial	70 people trapped in collapse	
Three-story car accessories store	Pyigyidagun, Mandalay	Commercial	10 employees trapped in collapse	
Construction building	Pyigyidagun, Mandalay	Construction building	Eight people killed in collapse, many others trapped	
Nagayon Pagoda	Amarapura	Religious building	Structural collapse	
Pahtodawgyi	Amarapura	Religious building	Structural damage, collapse	
Shweyinye Pagoda	Amarapura	Religious building	Structural damage	
Shwegugyi Pagoda	Amarapura	Religious building	Structural damage	
Taungthaman Bupaya	Amarapura	Religious building	Structural damage	
Sandamuni Pagoda	Amarapura	Religious building	Structural damage	
Taungmingyi Pagoda	Amarapura	Religious building	Structural damage	
Sinkyo Shwegu Pagoda	Amarapura	Religious building	Structural damage	
Thetdawya Thetdawshe Pagoda	Amarapura	Religious building	Structural damage	
U Lin Pagoda	Amarapura	Religious building	Structural damage	
Yadana Myintzu Pagoda	Amarapura	Religious building	Structural damage	
Shwesayan Pagoda	Patheingyi	Religious building	Buddhist historic site from 11th century, significantly damaged	
Maha Aungmye Bonzan Monastery	Inwa	Religious building	Structural collapse	
Yadana Hsemee Pagoda Complex	Inwa	Religious building	Structural collapse	
Thitsar Tike Pagoda	Inwa	Religious building	Structural collapse	
Shwezigon Pagoda, Inwa	Inwa	Religious building	Structural collapse	
Maha Lawka Tharaphu Pagoda	Inwa	Religious building	Structural damage, collapse	
Lawka Hteik Oo Pagoda	Inwa	Religious building	Structural damage, collapse	
Four-Storied Monastery	Inwa	Religious building	Structural damage, collapse	
Sin Kyone Fortress	Sin Kyone, Tada-U Township	Historic site	Inscription damage	
Shwezigon Pagoda	Pinya	Religious building	Structural damage	
Aungzigon Pagoda	Pinya	Religious building	Structural damage	
Shwe Taung Daw Pagoda	Pinya	Religious building	Structural damage	
Bagan	Bagan	Historic site	Several Buddhist temples dating from the 10th to the 13th centuries collapsed or were damaged.	
Thonbanhla Monastery	Pyay	Religious building	Structural collapse	
KBZ Bank	Pyawbwe	Bank	Structural collapse trapping 46+ inside.	
Sule Kone Mosque	Kyaukse	Mosque	Structural collapse	
Tamote Shinpin Shwegugyi Temple	Kyaukse	Religious building	Structural collapse	
Kyaukthittar Pagoda	Kyaukse	Religious building	Structural collapse	
Shwe Mu Htaw	Kyaukse	Religious building	Structural collapse	
Shwe Mu Htaw	Myittha	Religious building	Structural damage, collapse	
Pindaya Monastery	Pindaya	Religious building	Century-old stupas toppled, foundations cracked	
National Museum	Naypyidaw	Cultural institution	Significant interior debris reported	
Naypyidaw Hospital	Naypyidaw	Healthcare facility	Building damaged, emergency entrance collapsed with car crushed under concrete	
Nay Pyi Taw International Airport	Naypyidaw	Airport	Air traffic control tower collapsed, killing six with no reported survivors	
State Administration Council military headquarters	Naypyidaw	Military	Main headquarters and surrounding officer housing buildings severely damaged	
Thapyakone Market	Naypyidaw	Commercial	Market and nearby houses collapsed, causing fatalities	
Union Parliament	Naypyidaw	State legislative building	Several parliament buildings collapsed	
Government buildings	Naypyidaw	Government buildings	Several state government buildings collapsed, killing the permanent Secretary of the Labour Ministry, many senior Myanmar junta officials, and government employees.	
Myatsaw Nyinaung Pagoda	Taungoo	Religious building	Structural collapse	
Kan Taw Mosque	Taungoo	Mosque	Partial collapse during prayers. Killed five displaced children, as well as a novice. Total 24 dead.	
Weluwun School	Taungoo	School and shelter	Collapse, trapping at least 20	
Residential buildings	Kantbalu	Housing	Several collapsed in township area	
Religious buildings	Kantbalu	Religious	Several collapsed in township area	

=== In Thailand ===
Structure	City/Town	Type	Notes	References
Office of the Auditor General Building	Bangkok	Government building	33-story structure under construction collapsed. At least thirteen were killed, with dozens more trapped.	
Building in Bang Khun Thian	Bangkok	Private	Three-story structure collapsed	
Unspecified high-rise buildings	Bangkok	Various	Multiple buildings reported damaged with cracks	
All rapid transit lines (BTS, MRT, Airport Rail Link and SRT Red Lines)	Bangkok Metropolitan Region	Public transportation	Closed for safety checks, all lines except MRT Yellow Line and MRT Pink Line reopened the following day	
King Chulalongkorn Memorial Hospital	Bangkok	Hospital	Walls damaged with cracks, ceilings collapsed	A photo of the damage inside of the hospital
Maharaj Nakorn Chiang Mai Hospital	Chiang Mai	Hospital	Suffered cracks	
Lampang Hospital	Lampang	Hospital	Suffered cracked walls and collapsed ceilings	
Tourist pavilion at Pai Canyon	Mae Hong Son	Tourist site	Pavilion collapsed, with trees in the canyon falling	

=== In China ===
Structure	City/Town	Type	Notes	References
Unspecified buildings	Ruili	Various	Shopping mall garages collapsed, homes damaged	

== Gallery ==
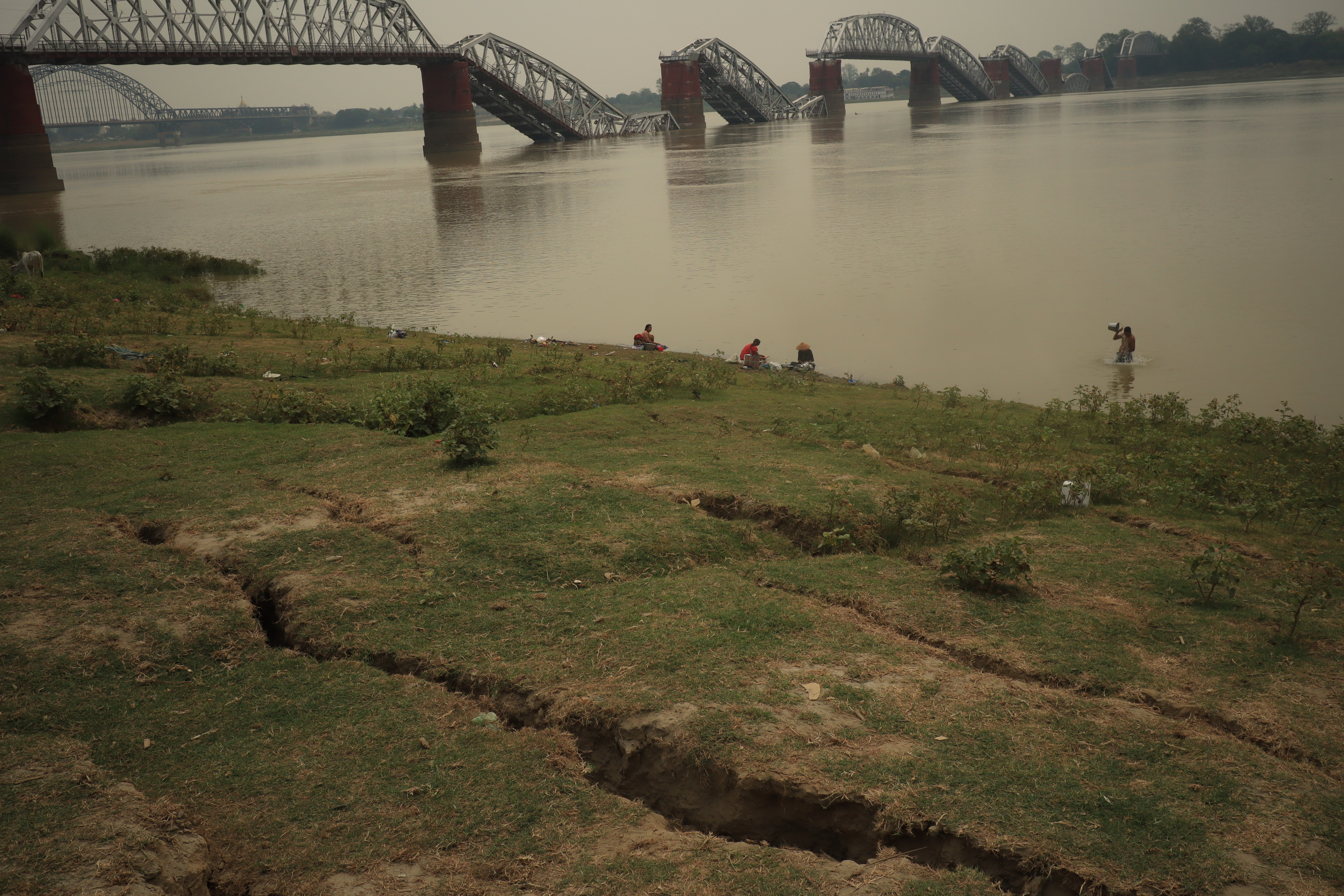
Fallen Ava Bridge

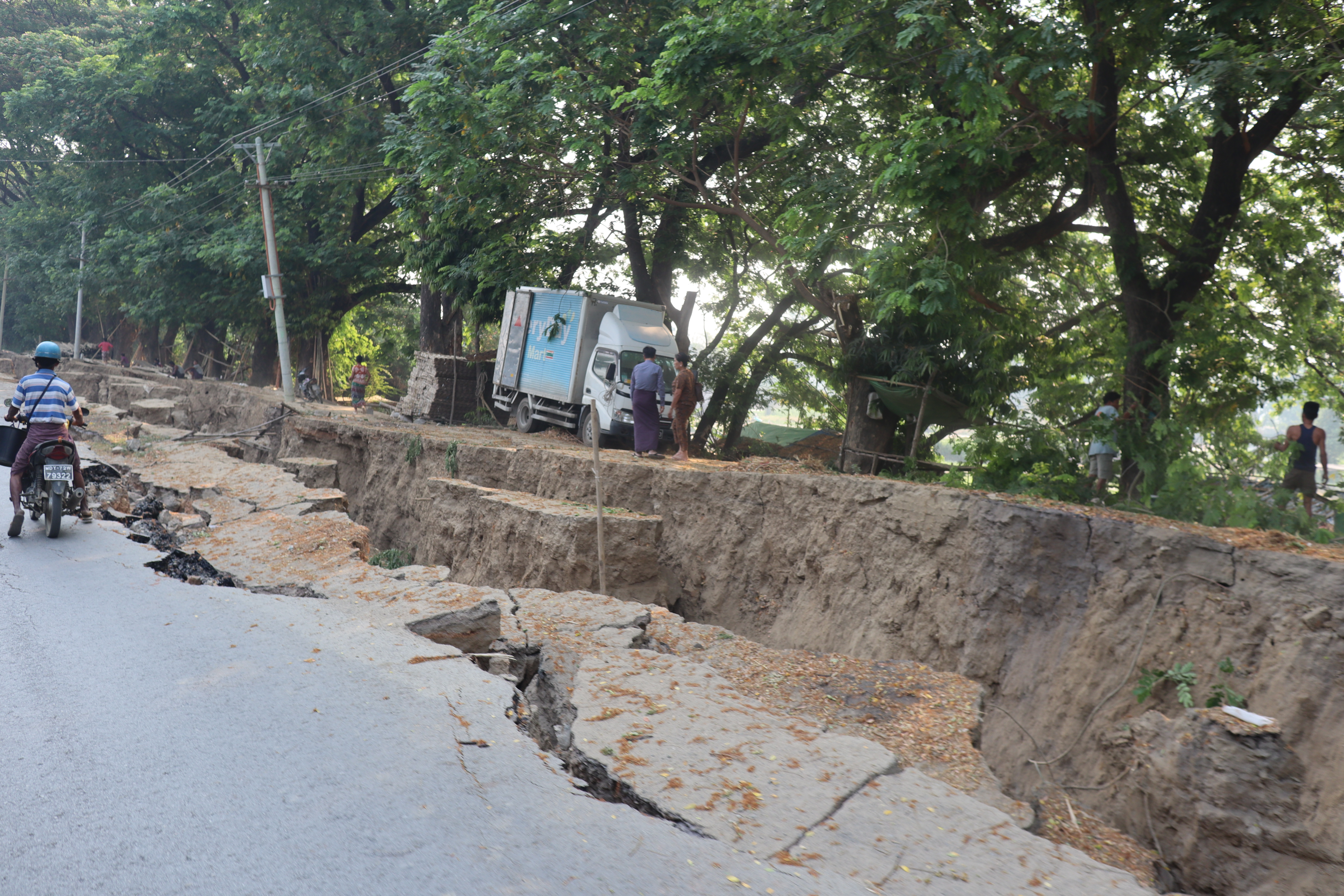
Lateral spreading in Sagaing

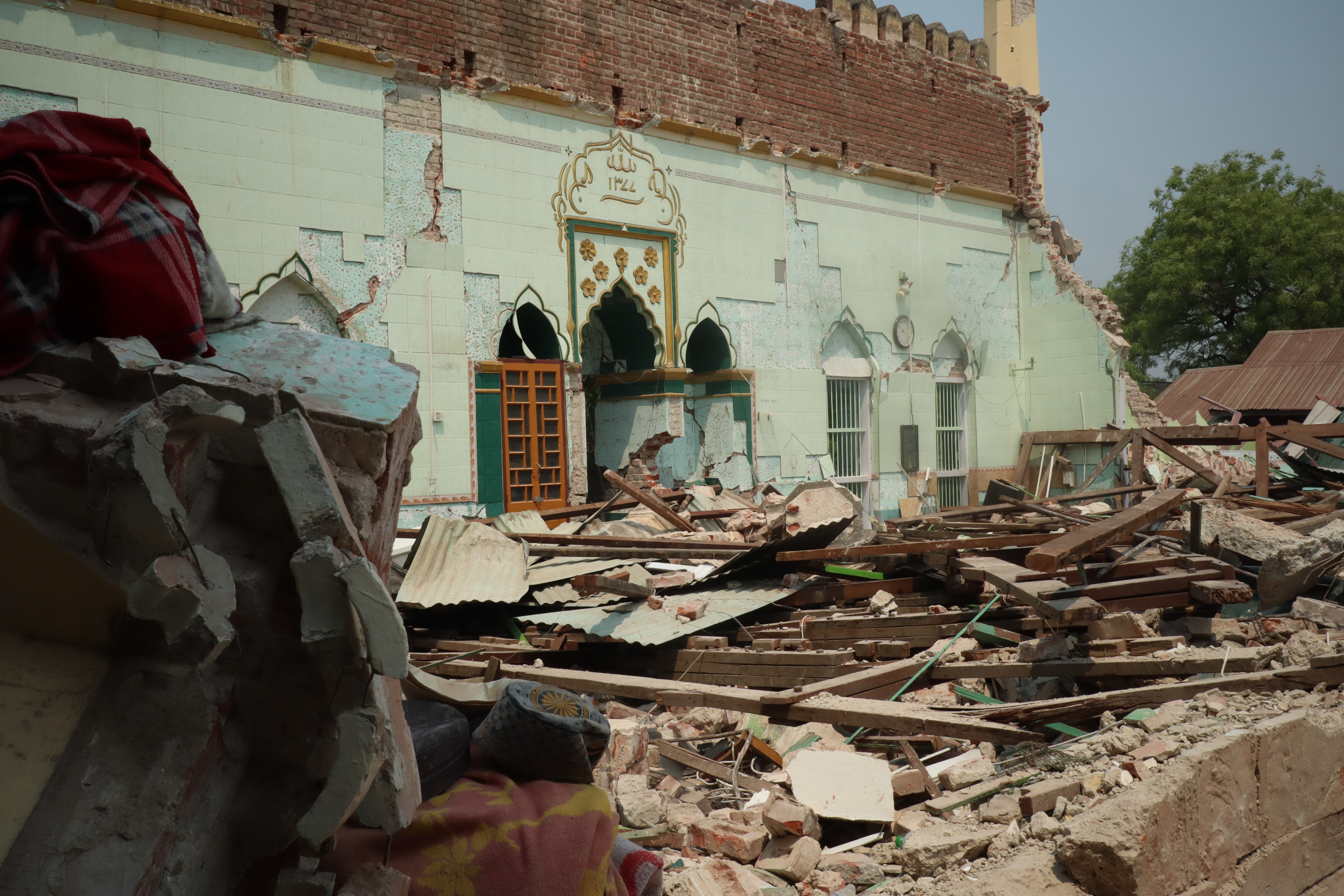
Sagaing Myoma Mosque after earthquake

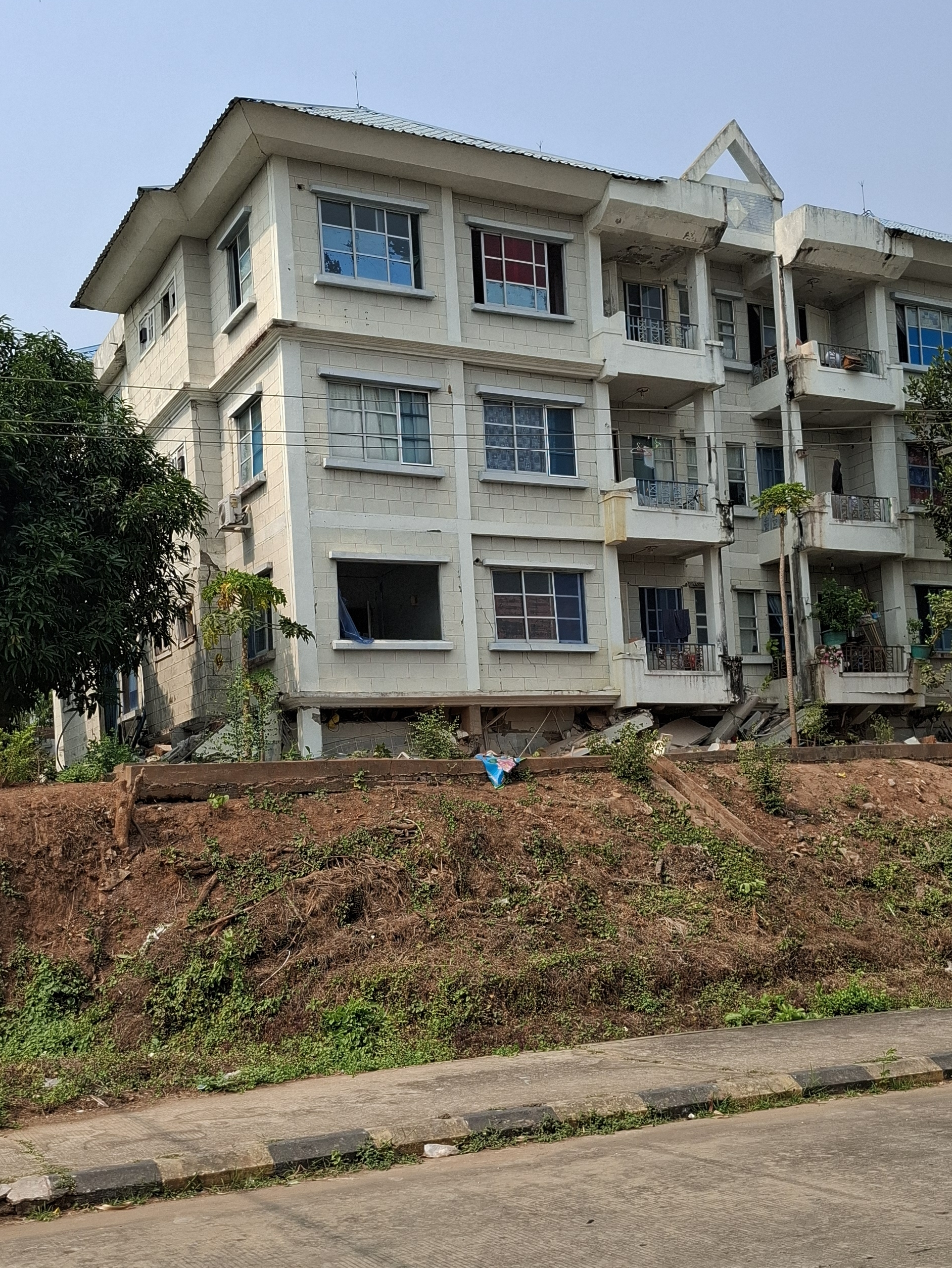
Partially-collapsed building in Naypyidaw

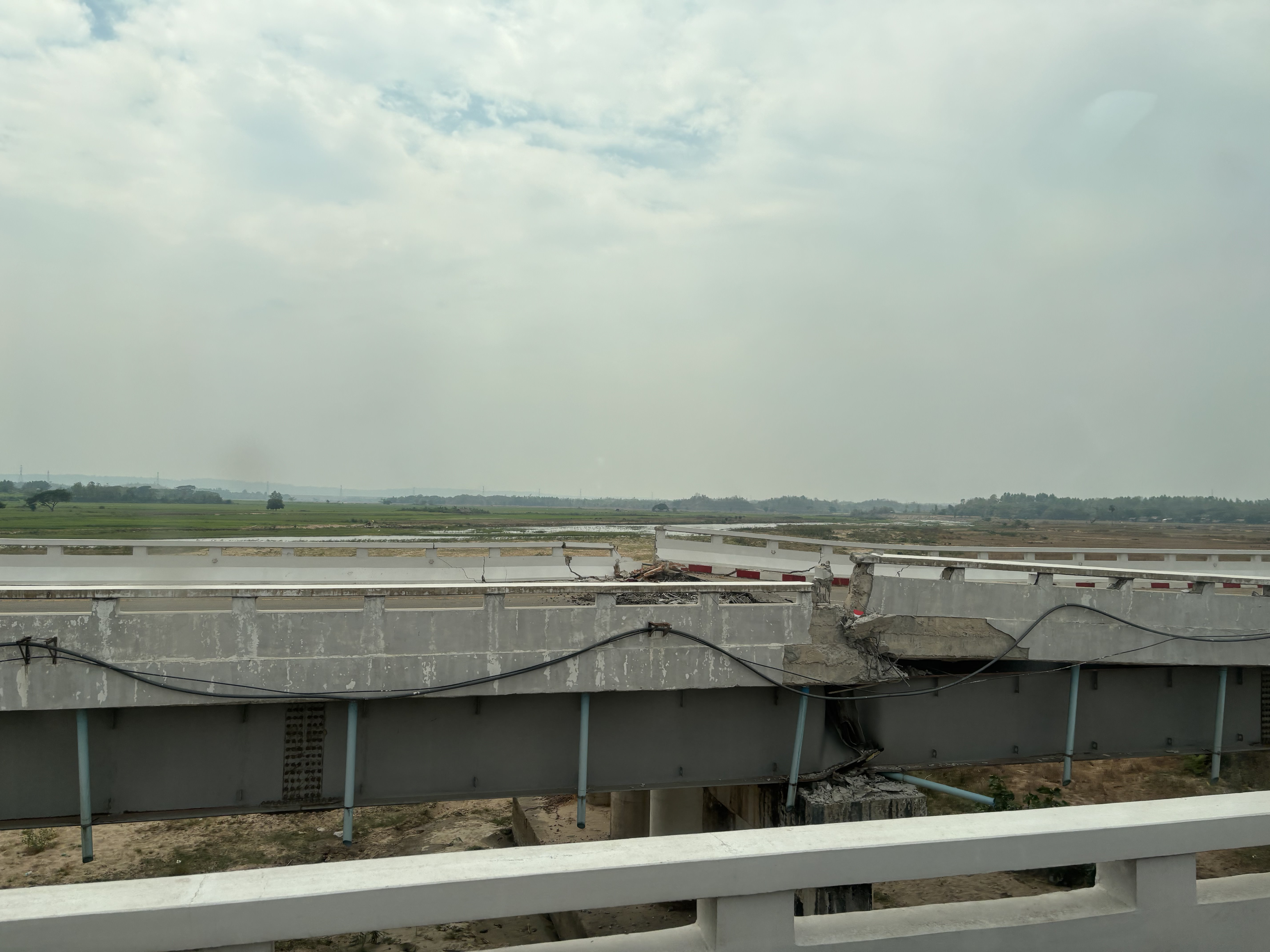
A damaged bridge on Yangon–Mandalay Expressway

== See also ==
- List of populated places affected by the 2010 Haiti earthquake
