= Kyauktawgyi Buddha Temple =

Kyauktawgyi Buddha Temple may refer to:

- Kyauktawgyi Buddha Temple (Mandalay)
- Kyauktawgyi Buddha Temple (Yangon)
- Kyauktawgyi Pagoda, located in Amarapura, Mandalay.
