= U Ya =

18th-century Burmese court poet and administrator

- ဦးယာ
- Born: c. 1748; Burma (present day Myanmar)
- Died: 1785
- Occupations: Poet, court official
- Writing career
- Period: Konbaung Dynasty
- Genres: E' poetry, yadu

U Ya (Burmese: ဦးယာ, also known as E' Maung Ya (Burmese: အဲမောင်ယာ) was a court poet known for his Tabaung Lapwe e' ching.

== Life ==
U Ya was born circa 1748. He gained prominence during the reigns of King Singu and Bodawpaya due to his significant contributions to the e' ching genre of poetry.

In 1776, during the reign of King Singu, U Yar was honored with the title of Nemyo Min Hla Kyaw Thu and serving as Akyidaw (အကြီးတော်; lit.the Venerable Senior) of second Queen of Northern Palace. From that time, he composed numerous yadu (poems) and E' (ballads) and authored the work Nyidaw Min Nan pyot.

After the dethroning of King Singu, Bodawpaya ascended the throne in 1781, U Yar wrote and composed the 12-season lu tar (a form of poetry) on the establishment of the royal capital, Amarapura. Impressed by his literary talents, Bodawpaya entrusted him with duties at the office of the Crown Prince. Later, U Yar was appointed to the position of Kuan yaydaw kine (the official responsible for offering water to the king) and subsequently became the governor of Martaban.

In 1785, U Yar died.
