= Sinkyo Shwegu Pagoda =

Buddhist Pagoda in Amarapura, Myanmar

Coordinates: 21°55′29″N 96°03′46″E

Sinkyo Shwegu Pagoda (ဆင်ကြိုရွှေကူဘုရား) is a Buddhist temple located in Amarapura, Myanmar. It was built by King Bodawpaya in 1784 as one of the city's four corner pagodas.

== History ==
King Bodawpaya ascended the throne in Amarapura in 1783. The following year, in 1784, he commissioned the construction of the city's four corner pagodas. Among them, the Sinkyo Shwegu Pagoda stands at the northwestern corner. The stupa stands at a height of 67 taung (approximately 101 feet). Within the stupa compound, there are two zayats (rest houses). The Paya Oo Zayat (the pagoda's front rest house) was donated by Htantabin Mibaya, a minor queen consort of King Bodawpaya, while the Taung Zayat (Southern rest house) was donated by Pakin Mibaya, another minor queen consort of the king. At the southwestern corner of the capital, the Shwe Linpin Pagoda was located, constructed by the Princess of Hinthada, daughter of King Bodawpaya.

During World War II, residents took refuge in this sacred pagoda to shelter from the fighting. Miraculously, it escaped bomb damage, and those who sought protection there survived unharmed. Because of this, the Sinkyo Shwegu Pagoda came to be reverently known as the "Khatkyaw Pagoda" (literally, "Disaster-Defying Pagoda").

The pagoda was damaged during the 2025 Myanmar earthquake.
