= Kayla, Myanmar =

Village in Shan State, Myanmar

Kay Lar ကေလာရွာ
- Town
- Interactive map of Kay Lar
- Coordinates: 20.507°N 96.905°E
- Country: Myanmar
- Region: Shan State
- District: Kalaw District
- Township: Nyaungshwe Township
- Village tract: Inn Chan Kay Lar
- Time zone: UTC+6:30 (MMT)

Kayla (Burmese: ကေလာရွာ) is a village in the Inn Chan Kay Lar, village tract Nyaungshwe Township, Shan State, Myanmar.

== History ==
Kayla was heavily affected by the 2025 Myanmar earthquake. Over 50 people were killed in the village alone.

== See also ==
- List of populated places affected by the 2025 Myanmar earthquake
