= Waing Kyun =

Village in Myanmar

Waing Kyun ဝိုင်ကျွန်းကျေးရွာ
- Village
- Interactive map of Waing Kyun
- Coordinates: 18.0067°N 96.8166°E
- Country: Myanmar
- Region: Bago Region
- District: Nyaunglebin District
- Township: Shwegyin Township
- Village tract: Waing Kyun
- Time zone: UTC+6:30 (MMT)

Waing Kyun (Burmese: ဝိုင်ကျွန်း), also spelled Wi Kyun, is a village in Shwegyin Township in the Bago Region of Myanmar. It is the principal village of the Waing Kyun village tract, which contains three other villages.

== History ==
In 2023, Waing Kyun was affected by shelling amid the Myanmar civil war.

In the 2025 Myanmar earthquake, there was reports of damage to farms and buildings, including a pagoda and a cemetery.

== See also ==
- List of populated places affected by the 2025 Myanmar earthquake
