= Taung Mingyi Pagoda =

Buddhist temple in Myanmar

Coordinates: 21°53′39″N 96°03′03″E

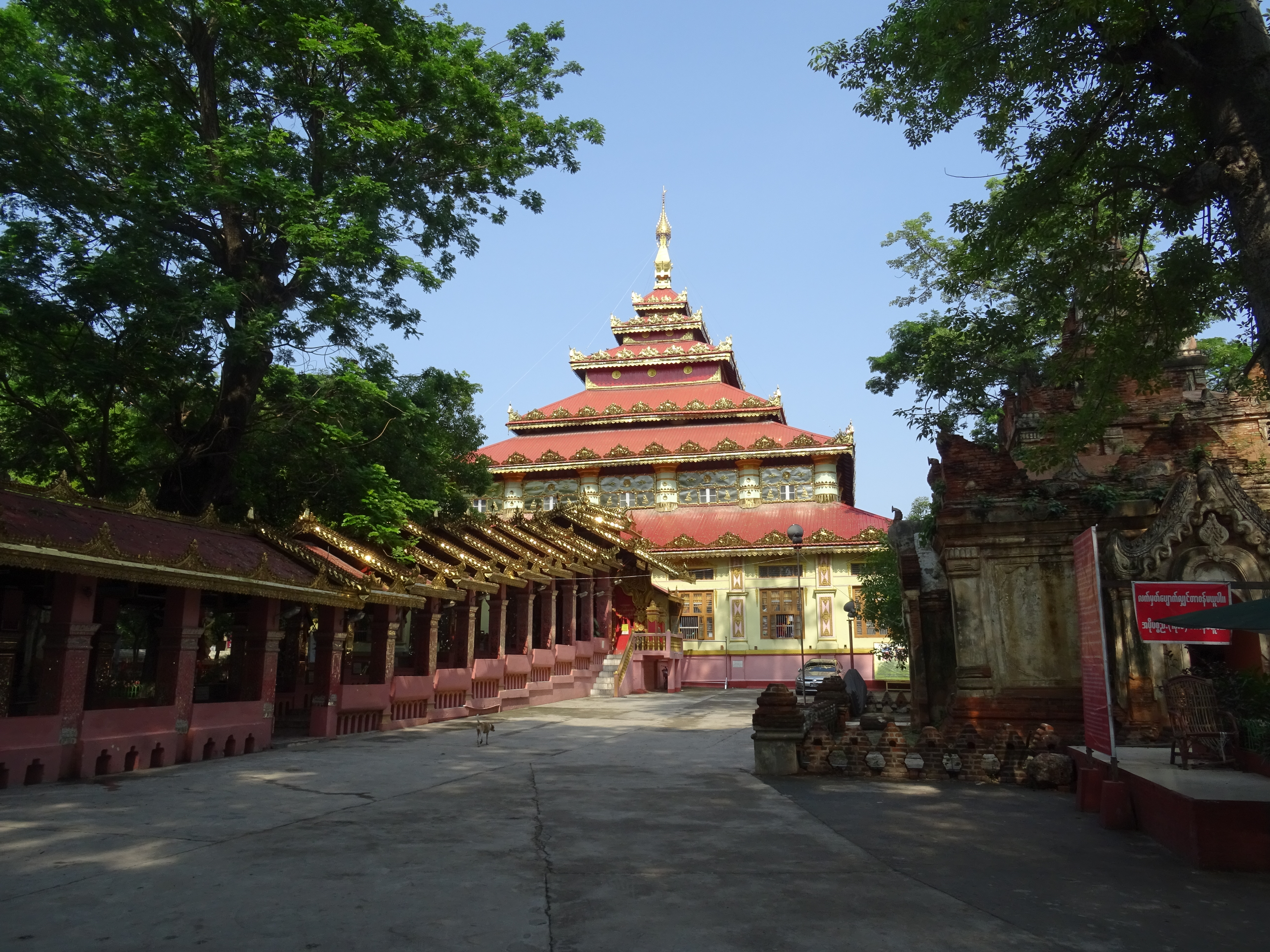
The prayer hall of Taung Mingyi Pagoda

Taung Mingyi Pagoda (Burmese: တောင်မင်းကြီးဘုရား; lit. 'The pagoda of the lord of south') is a Buddhist temple near Taungthaman Lake, Amarapura, Myanmar. The pagoda is one of the Four Great Pagodas of Amarapura (အမရပူရ ကြီးလေးဆူ). The Taung Mingyi image (lit 'the Lord of the South') is enshrined in this temple.

== History ==
The pagoda was originally built in 1786 by Minister Thaung Mingyi, also known as Maha Min Hla Kyawzwa, who held the position of Athe wun (Minister of the civilian taxpayer and commoner). Due to his concurrent role as Sinbyu Wun (Chief of the White Elephants), the pagoda came to be colloquially known as the "Sinbyu Shin Pagoda" (ဆင်ဖြူရှင်ဘုရား).

In 1838, the pagoda was damaged by an earthquake. In 1850, a restoration was ordered by King Pagan Min. The restoration was led by Hlwahtonggyi U Mone, who received the royal directive. The restoration was completed in 1853, the year King Mindon ascended the throne.

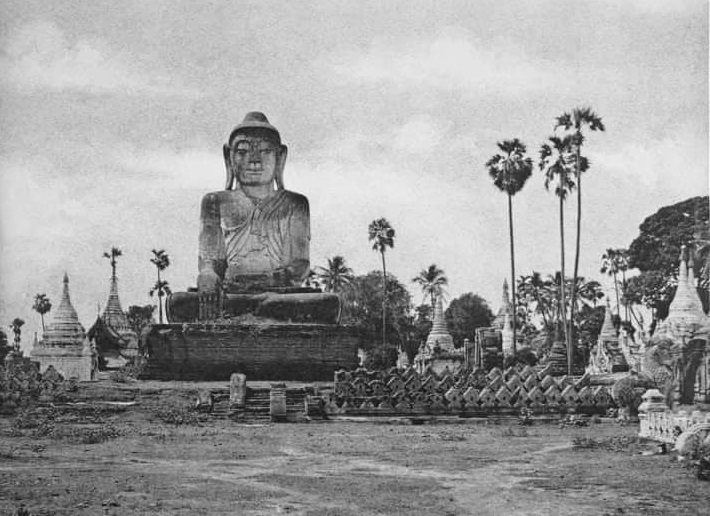
Taung Mingyi Pagoda in 1855.

The Buddha image stands at an impressive height of 46 feet 11 inches (14.3 meters) and a width of 36 feet 6 inches (11.1 meters), with a crown height of 13 feet 1 inch (4 meters). The original prayer hall (tazaung) that housed this Buddha image was destroyed over time due to weathering. Given the statue's enormous size and the likely high cost of reconstruction, a new prayer hall was never built, leaving the Buddha image exposed to both the scorching sun and monsoon rains. This unique situation led devotees to respectfully refer to the statue as "Naypu Khan Kodawgyi" (နေပူခံကိုယ်တော်ကြီး), meaning "The Great Sun-Exposed Buddha." A wealthy merchant named U Yin Kalay from Amarapura's Chinese area funded the construction of a new prayer hall to shelter the previously sun-exposed Buddha image. As a result, the original name "Naypu Khan Kodawgyi" gradually faded from use, and the site later became known as the Taung Mingyi Pagoda.

The pagoda was again damaged during the 2025 Myanmar earthquake.
