= Taw Kyaung Pauk =

Set of villages in Myanmar

Taw Kyaung Pauk (Lower) / Taw Kyaung Pauk (Middle) / Taw Kyaung Pauk (Upper) တောကြောင်ပေါက် (အောက်) / တောကြောင်ပေါက် (အလယ်) / တောကြောင်ပေါက် (အထက်)
- Village
- Interactive map of Taw Kyaung Pauk (Lower) / Taw Kyaung Pauk (Middle) / Taw Kyaung Pauk (Upper)
- Coordinates: 18.2194°N 96.6923°E
- Country: Myanmar
- Region: Bago Region
- District: Nyaunglebin District
- Township: Kyaukkyi Township
- Village Tract: Daung Moet
- Time zone: UTC+6:30 (MMT)

Taw Kyaung Pauk (Burmese: တောကြောင်ပေါက်, lit. 'Newborn Forest Kittens') is group of three villages in Kyaukkyi Township in the Bago Region of Myanmar. It consists of Taw Kyaung Pauk (Upper), Taw Kyaung Pauk (Middle) and Taw Kyaung Pauk (Lower) villages and is located in the Daung Moet village tract.

== History ==
In the 2025 Myanmar earthquake, 2 people were killed and houses were destroyed in the village.

== See also ==
- List of populated places affected by the 2025 Myanmar earthquake
