= Masoyein Monastery =

Buddhist monastery in Mandalay, Myanmar

Coordinates: 21.967758°N 96.069389°E

Masoyein Monastery (Burmese: မစိုးရိမ်ကျောင်းတိုက်, romanized: Ma.cui:rim. Kyaung:-Tuik), also known as Masoeyein Monastery, is a Buddhist monastery in Mandalay, Myanmar. It collapsed during the 2025 Myanmar earthquake.

== See also ==
- List of structures and infrastructure affected by the 2025 Myanmar earthquake
