= Zayatgyi, Shan =

Village in Shan State, Myanmar

Za Yat Gyi ဇရပ်ကြီးရွာ
- Town
- Interactive map of Za Yat Gyi
- Coordinates: 20.487°N 96.906°E
- Country: Myanmar
- Region: Shan State
- District: Kalaw District
- Township: Nyaungshwe Township
- Village tract: Inn Chan Kay Lar
- Time zone: UTC+6:30 (MMT)

Zayatgyi (Burmese: ဇရပ်ကြီးရွာ) is a village in the Inn Chan Kay Lar village tract, Nyaungshwe Township, Shan State, Myanmar.

== History ==
Zayatgyi was heavily affected by the 2025 Myanmar earthquake.

== See also ==
- List of populated places affected by the 2025 Myanmar earthquake
