= Bone Oe =

Village tract in Myanmar

Bone Oe ဘုံးအိုးကျေးရွာအုပ်စု
- Village tract
- Interactive map of Bone Oe
- Coordinates: 20.872°N 95.709°E
- Country: Myanmar
- Region: Mandalay Region
- District: Meiktila District
- Township: Meiktila Township
- Time zone: UTC+6:30 (MMT)

Bone Oe is a village tract in the Mandalay Region region of Myanmar. It is located in rural Meiktila Township and has 8 constituent villages- Ah Choke Su, Bon Tuang Hne Su, Dar Ka, Let Tha Mar, Yet Kan Taw, Bone Oe Bo East, Bone Oe Bo West and Bone Oe Bo Central.

== History ==
Bone Oe was heavily affected by the 2025 Myanmar earthquake. There are reportedly over 100 fatalities in the village alone.

== See also ==
- List of populated places affected by the 2025 Myanmar earthquake
