= Four-Storied Monastery =

Historic building in Inwa, Myanmar

Coordinates: 21°50′25″N 95°58′38″E

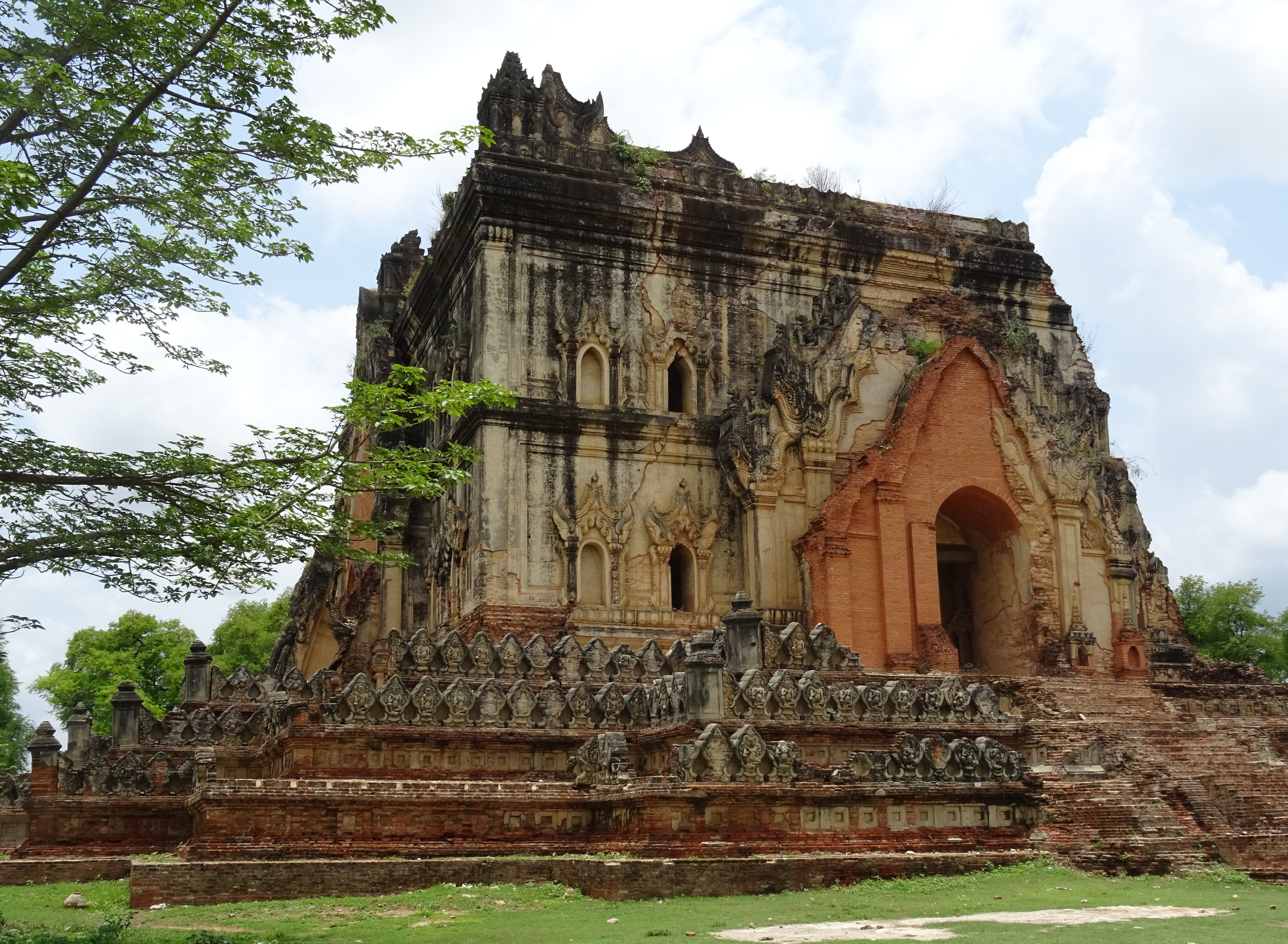
The Four-Storied Monastery in 2018

The Four-Storied Monastery (Burmese: လေးထပ်ကျောင်းတော်, also transliterated as Lay Htat Kyee Monastery) is a historic site in Inwa, Myanmar. It is dedicated to Theravada Buddhism.

== History ==
The Four-Storied Monastery is the original site of the Sakyamuni (also known as Skarthiha) Pagoda, which is now located in Mandalay. The original four-storied monastery was built and donated by King Nyaung Ram, the founder of the Second Innwa Dynasty, in 1601. However, in 1658, during the reign of King Pintale, the original four-storied monastery was destroyed by fire.

During the reign of King Bakyidaw of the Konbaung period, in 1827, the Great Sakyamuni Buddha was cast. The Sakyamuni Buddha image was cast with a mixture of pure gold, pure silver, pure copper, iron, and gold, and weighed 16,110 peissas. King Bakyidaw donated a large brick pagoda to house the image on the site of the former four-story monastery. It is called the Four-story Monastery. He started the construction and donated the water in 1835. The statue has been around for over 180 years, and the four-story monastery has also been around for over 180 years.

In 1838, the main temple was damaged by an earthquake, so in 1847, during the reign of King Bagan, it was moved to the Maha Wai Yang Bontha Pyay Sard, south of the pagoda near Taung Thaman Lake, the capital of Amarapura. In 1855, during the reign of King Thibaw it was moved again to the current location of the Sintu Dawa, which was the former residence of his father, King Mindon. The four-story temple collapsed during the earthquake on March 28, 2025.
