= Shwe Linpin Pagoda =

Buddhist Pagoda in Amarapura, Myanmar

Coordinates: 21°54′41″N 96°03′42″E

Shwe Linpin Pagoda (ရွှေလင်းပင်ဘုရား) is a Buddhist temple located in Amarapura, Myanmar. It was built in 1784 by the Hinthada Princess, daughter of King Bodawpaya, as one of the city's four corner pagodas.

== History ==
According to historical records, King Bodawpaya ordered the construction of Amarapura's four corner pagodas in 1784, a year after taking the throne. He sent a Buddha image—originally built by King Narapati Sithu of the Pagan—to be enshrined as a place of worship at the southwestern corner of Amarapura. The temple housing this Buddha image was constructed by his daughter, the Princess of Hinthada, and was named Shwe Linpin Pagoda. The stupa stands at a height of 67 taung (approximately 101 feet).
