= Kuanyin Si Temple =

Buddhist temple in Amarapura, Myanmar

Coordinates: 21°58′35.2″N 96°04′48.4″E

Kuanyin Si Temple (ကွမ်ယင်စီဘုရားကျောင်း) is a historic Chinese Buddhist temple located on Chinatown Road in Amarapura, Myanmar. Built in 1773 during the reign of King Singu, it now serves as one of the oldest Chinese Buddhist temples in Myanmar.

== History ==
As a symbol of cultural exchange between Burma and China, it was built during the reign of King Singu in 1773. To support the construction of the temple, Chinese officials in Burma court such as Akauk wun (minister of tax) Min Haw Hot, court official Haw Guangjin, and Minister Kyin Kyaw also contributed donations. The temple was destroyed by fire three times: once in 1810 during the reign of King Bodawpaya, again in 1829 during the reign of King Bagyidaw, and once more in 1837 during the reign of King Tharrawaddy. When it was rebuilt in 1838, also during King Tharrawaddy's reign, the brick walls were constructed tall to serve as fire barriers, and the temple's carvings were intricately crafted. Due to the detailed nature of the construction, the rebuilding took nine years and was completed in 1847 during the reign of King Pagan.

In 1857, when King Mindon moved the royal capital from Amarapura to the newly founded city of Mandalay, he ensured that the historic temple remained preserved at its original location as a heritage site.

Inside the temple, a historical artifact remains preserved to this day—the ceremonial table used by King Bodawpaya and his chief queen during their visit in 1816.
