= Umin Thonze Pagoda =

Buddhist pagoda in Myanmar

- ဥမင် သုံးဆယ် ဘုရား
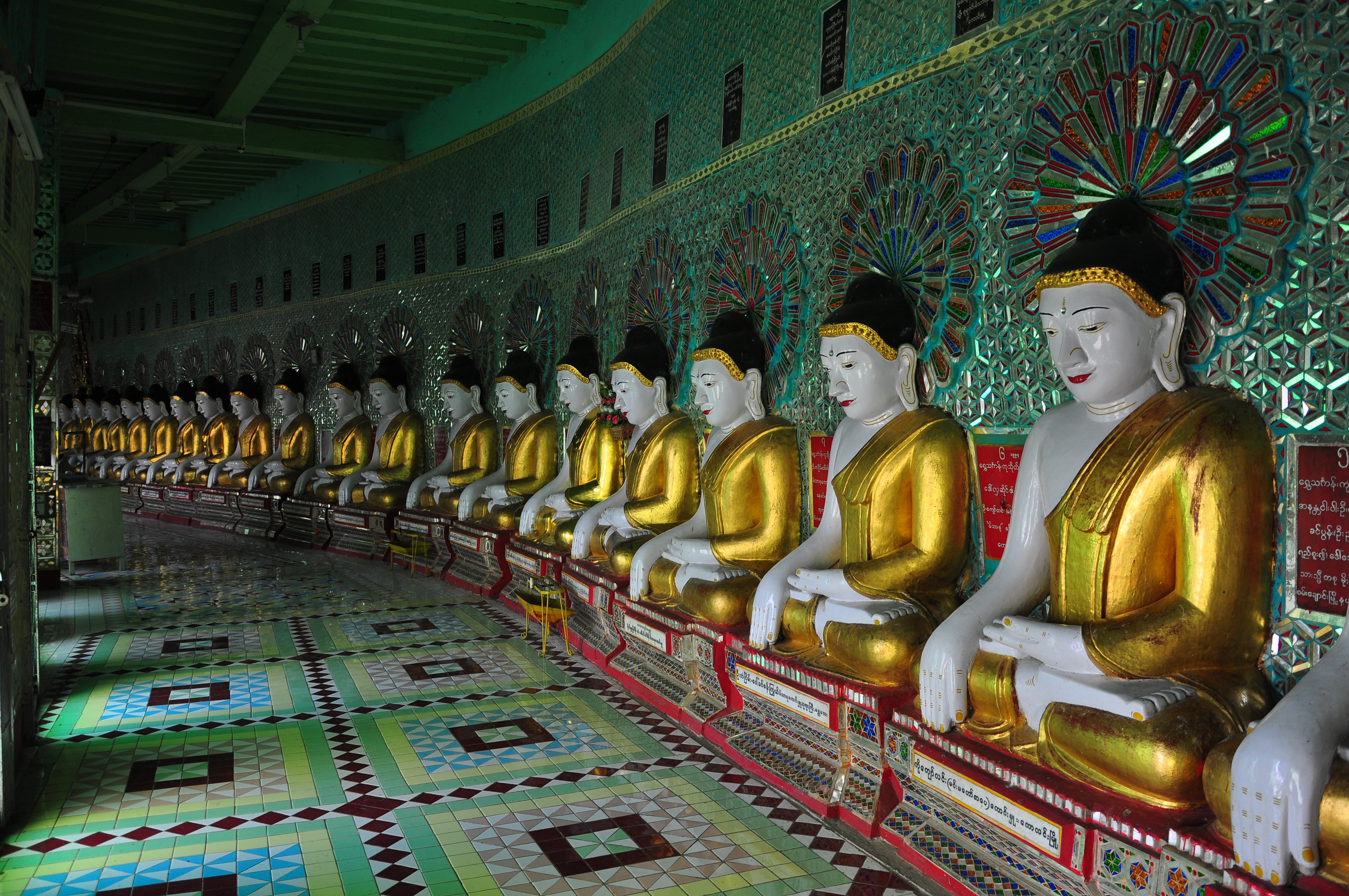
- Inside view of the Umin Thonze

Religion
- Affiliation: Theravada Buddhism

Location
- Location: Sagaing
- Interactive map of Umin Thonze Pagoda
- Coordinates: 21.9115549°N 95.9904873°E

Architecture
- Completed: 1330s 1847 (renovated)

The Umin Thonze Pagoda (Burmese: ဥမင် သုံးဆယ် ဘုရား) is a Buddhist stupa, located in the Sagaing Hills, Myanmar. The pagoda was founded by King Tarabya I (r. 1327–1335/36) of the Sagaing kingdom. It was renovated in 1643 and again in 1723. In 1838, a major earthquake essentially destroyed the pagoda. King Pagan Min (r. 1846–53) rebuilt the pagoda, completing it in 1847. (Note: (Khin Maung Nyunt 2006: 98) translates the 13th waxing of Tabaung [1208 ME] as March 1846 CE but the professor's translation is incorrect. Per the Konbaung Set Yazawin chronicle (Maung Maung Tin, Vol. 3 2004: 56), King Pagan Min's coronation ceremony took place on Saturday, 13th waxing of Tabaung 1208 ME, which translates to Saturday, 27 February 1847.) It has a cave with 45 seated Buddha images arranged in a curved formation and decorated with sparkling glass-works behind them.

== Bibliography ==
- Khin Maung Nyunt (2006). Radio Talks on Myanma Culture. Vol. 1. Yangon: Ministry of Information, Union of Myanmar.
- Maung Maung Tin, U (2004) [1905]. Konbaung Set Yazawin (in Burmese). Vol. 1–3. Yangon: Department of Universities History Research, University of Yangon.
