= Yadana Hsemee Pagoda Complex =

Historical site in Inwa, Myanmar

Coordinates: 21°51′16.1″N 95°58′09.3″E

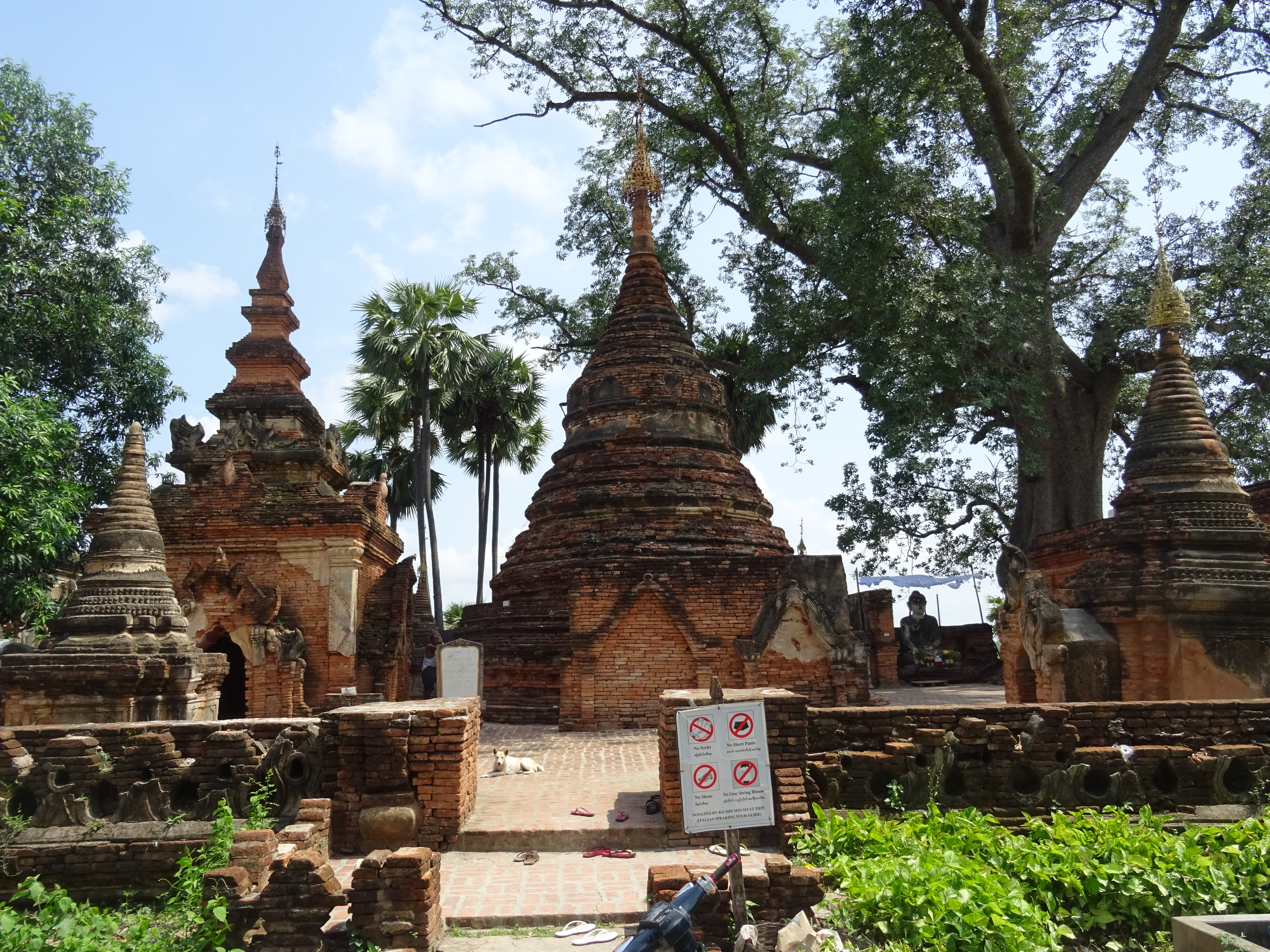
The Yadana Hsemee Pagoda Complex

The Yadana Hsemee Pagoda Complex (ရတနာဆီမီးဘုရားစု) is a significant historical and religious site located in Inwa (Ava), Myanmar, situated west of the old Ava Palace ruins in Apyin Sanyar Village, Tada-U Township, Mandalay Region. This ancient complex consists of six stupas, one brick monastery, and three Gandhakuti halls. The complex contains ten architecturally important structures, numbered 372 to 381, showcasing early Konbaung-style brickwork and Buddha images. Surrounded by toddy palms, the site is a popular tourist attraction.

The pagoda was damaged during the 2025 Myanmar earthquake.
