= Meiktila Township =

- Township
- Location in Meiktila district

- Location within Myanmar
- Coordinates: 20°53′N 95°53′E
- Country: Burma
- Division: Mandalay Division
- District: Meiktila District
- Capital: Meiktila
- Time zone: UTC+6:30 (MMT)

Meiktila Township (Burmese: မိတ္ထီလာ မြို့နယ်) is a township of Meiktila District in the Mandalay Division of Burma.

== History ==
Meiktila Township was heavily affected by the 2025 Myanmar earthquake.

== Settlements ==
- Bone Oe
