= Zedi Hla =

Buddhist temple in Sagaing, Myanmar

Coordinates: 21°53′02.5″N 95°59′04.7″E

Zedi Hla (စေတီလှ) is a historic Buddhist pagoda located on the Minwun mountain ridge in Sagaing, Myanmar. The pagoda was built in 1315 by Athinkhaya Saw Yun, founder of the Sagaing Kingdom, and is one of the nine key structures established during the founding of Sagaing and its royal capital. It is often referred to by the phrase, "The beginning of Sagaing is Zedi Hla," highlighting its foundational significance to the city.

The pagoda was damaged during the 2025 Myanmar earthquake.
