= Kyauktawgyi Pagoda =

Buddhist Pagoda in Amarapura, Myanmar

- ကျောက်တော်ကြီးဘုရား
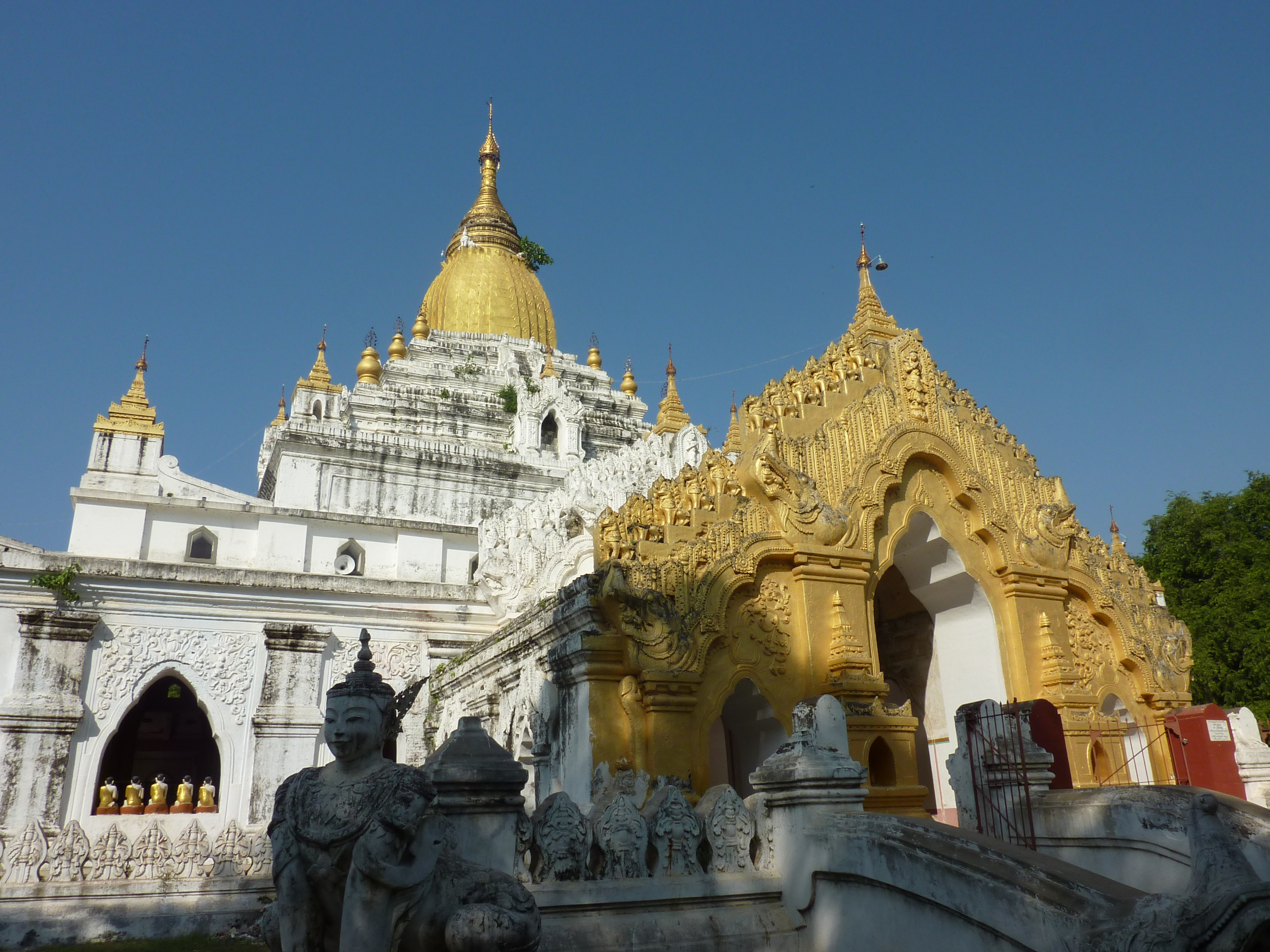

- Location within Myanmar

Religion
- Affiliation: Theravada Buddhism

Location
- Country: Amarapura, Mandalay Region, Burma
- Coordinates: 21.894381°N 96.064781°E

Architecture
- Founder: King Pagan Min
- Completed: 1847; 179 years ago

Kyauktawgyi Pagoda (Burmese: ကျောက်တော်ကြီးဘုရား; also known as the Taungthaman Kyauktawgyi) is a Buddhist pagoda located in Amarapura, Burma, near the Taungthaman Lake. It was built in 1847 by King Pagan Min on the model of the Ananda Pagoda at Pagan.

It exemplifies a type of architecture, which though borrowed from the Indian designs at Pagan, was constructed entirely by Burmese architects. The artistic value of the pagoda lies in the numerous frescoes with which its four porches are adorned. They represent religious buildings, in various styles of architecture, built or repaired by Pagan Min at Sagaing, Amarapura, Ava, Pakangyi, Prome, and Rangoon, and the planets and the constellations according to Burmese ideas of astronomy. The human figures depict the dresses and customs of the Konbaung period. The pagoda is crowned with a five-tiered pyatthat roof.
