= Pahtodawgyi =

White Buddhist Pagoda in Amarapura, Myanmar

Mahawizayayanthi Pahtodawgyi
- Mahawizayayanthi Pahtoedawgyi မဟာဝိဇယရံသီပုထိုးတော်ကြီး
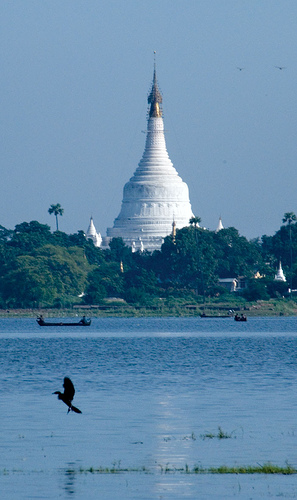

- Location within Myanmar

Religion
- Affiliation: Theravada Buddhism

Location
- Location: Amarapura, Mandalay Region, Burma
- Coordinates: 21.911432°N 96.056438°E

Architecture
- Founder: King Bagyidaw
- Established: 1819; 207 years ago

Mahawizayayanthi Pahtoedawgyi

(Burmese: မဟာဝိဇယရံသီပုထိုးတော်ကြီး) is a Buddhist pagoda located in Amarapura, Burma, north of the Taungthaman Lake. It was built in 1819 by King Bagyidaw.

== History ==
On 10 April 1819, King Bagyidaw built the pagoda and enshrined the sacred relics of the Buddha, along with numerous Buddha statues cast in pure gold. The pagoda stands at an impressive height of 120 taung (approximately 27 meters or 88.5 feet).

On 22 March 1839, a powerful earthquake struck Sagaing, causing the sacred hti (ornamental crown) of the pagoda to collapse. Following the disaster, the pagoda remained without its hti for 34 years, until 1872, when King Mindon ordered the installation of a new hti. The replacement crown stood 13 taung and 1 twa tall (approximately 7.9 meters or 26 feet), with a circumference of 9 taung and 2 maik (about 5.5 meters or 18 feet). The project was supervised by the Popa wun, the governor of the Popa region.

The hti donated by King Mindon also collapsed due to an earthquake in 1912 (Myanmar Era 1274). As a result, the pagoda remained without hti for seven years. It was not until 1919 (Myanmar Era 1281), seven years later, that the residents of Amarapura donated and installed a new hti. However, this hti was again damaged during the earthquake of July 1956.

The pagoda was again damaged during the 2025 Myanmar earthquake.
