= Ayeik Ma Htwet Pagoda =

Buddhist temple in Mandalay, Myanmar

Coordinates: 22°00′31.7″N 96°05′17.7″E

Ayeik Ma Htwet Pagoda (အရိပ်မထွက်ဘုရား; lit. “Shadowless Pagoda”) is a Buddhist temple located in Aungmyethazan Township, Mandalay, Myanmar. According to a stone inscription found at the northeast corner of the pagoda's platform, the temple was built in 1064 (Burmese era 426) by King Kyansittha of the Pagan Kingdom.

== History ==
It is recorded that after building the pagoda, King Kyansittha made a solemn vow near the end of his life, declaring, "May the shadow of this pagoda never fall again in any future [life] when I am reborn as a human." Remarkably, the pagoda is said to cast no shadow under sunlight, a phenomenon that earned it the name Ayeik Ma Htwet, meaning "Shadowless Pagoda".

An alternative account suggests that the pagoda was constructed during the reign of King Thado Uzana of the Tagaung Kingdom. According to this version, Karyabala, the king's military commander, arrived at the site while conducting a campaign across the kingdom. As his vanguard troops rested, the general witnessed a miraculous six-rayed aureole of light emanating from the sacred Buddha relics that he carried for worship. Interpreting this as a divine sign, he proclaimed the site as a sacred location worthy of a pagoda. He then established a stupa at the spot, enshrining the relics within its inner chamber.

In 220 BCE (the 323rd year of the Buddhist era), King Uparaja of Tagaung offered a golden umbrella (hti) to the pagoda. During the reign of King Alaungsithu, the pagoda was first renovated by his eldest son, Crown Prince Min Shin Saw, and later by King Narapatisithu of Pagan. Subsequently, Crown Prince Thado Minsaw, undertook further renovations and made offerings. In the Konbaung period, Thado Mingyi Maha Thamindabayaza, a minister of King Mindon, also carried out restoration work.

In 1891, after the fall of the Konbaung dynasty, Haw Yawd, a minister of Hsipaw State, along with a group of Shan merchants, offered a golden umbrella (hti) to the pagoda and donated a golden robe (shwe thingan) to the Buddha image.

In 1895, the pagoda collapsed due to an earthquake and was subsequently restored by local residents. The pagoda collapsed again during the 2025 Myanmar earthquake.
