= Sun U Ponnyashin Pagoda =

Buddhist Pagoda in Sagaing City, Myanmar

Swan Oo Ponnya Shin Pagoda
- ဆွမ်းဦးပုညရှင်စေတီ
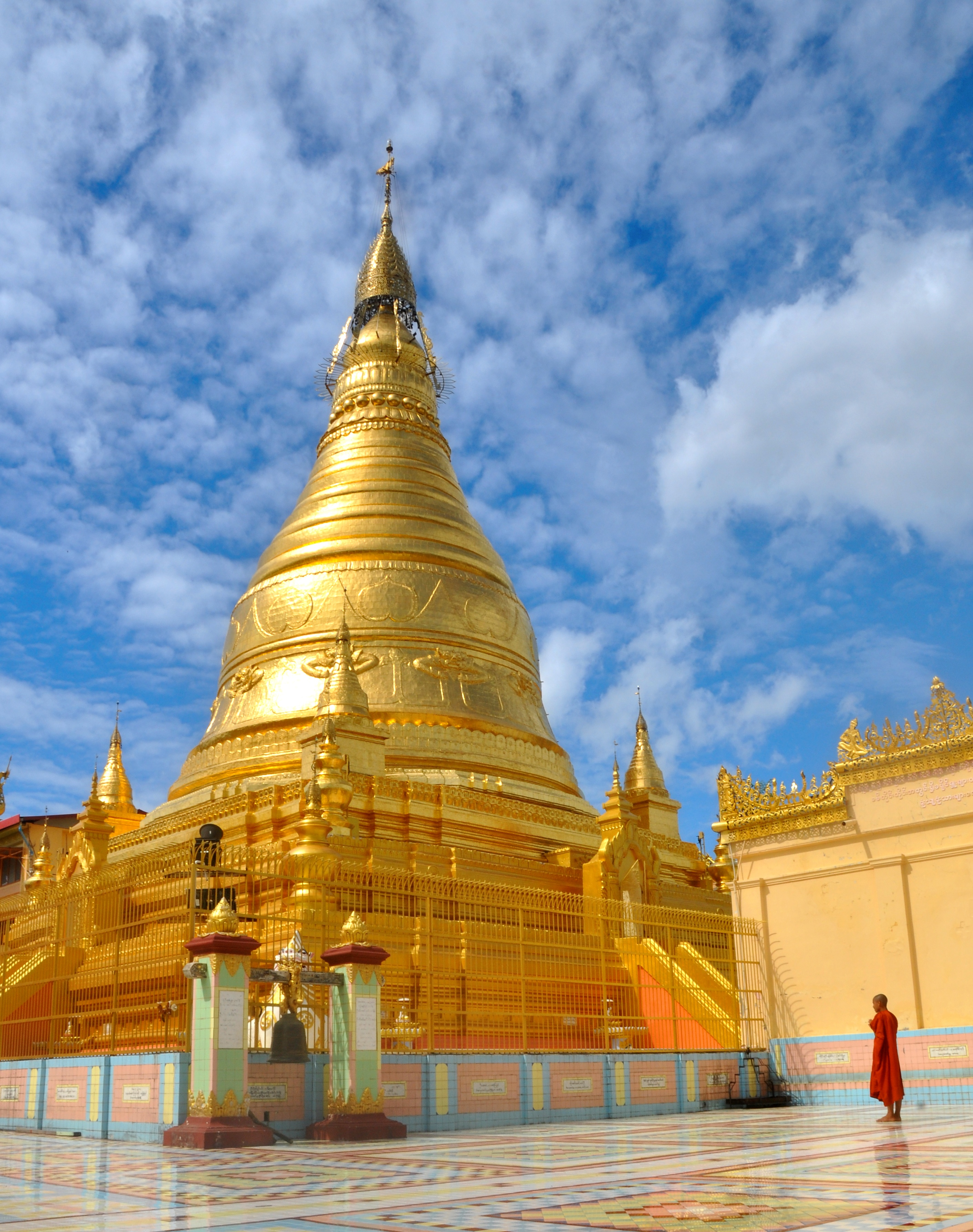
- A young monk at Soon Oo Pon Nya Shin pagoda

- Location within Myanmar

Religion
- Affiliation: Theravada Buddhism

Location
- Location: Sagaing, Myanmar
- Country: Myanmar
- Coordinates: 21.901691°N 95.992302°E

Architecture
- Founder: U Ponnya

Swan Oo Ponnya Shin (ဆွမ်းဦးပုညရှင်စေတီတော်) is a Buddhist pagoda located in Sagaing, Myanmar. The pagoda was purportedly founded in 1312 by Ponnya, a junior minister at the court of King Thihathu of Myinsaing–Pinya. The pagoda is located at the top of Ponnya Shin Hill, the second highest mountain in Sagaing. It sustained damage to its spire and structural components during the 2025 Myanmar earthquake. Its restoration was said to have been completed in the beginning of April 2026.
