= Amarapura =

Township of Mandalay, Burma

Amarapura အမရပူရ
- Township
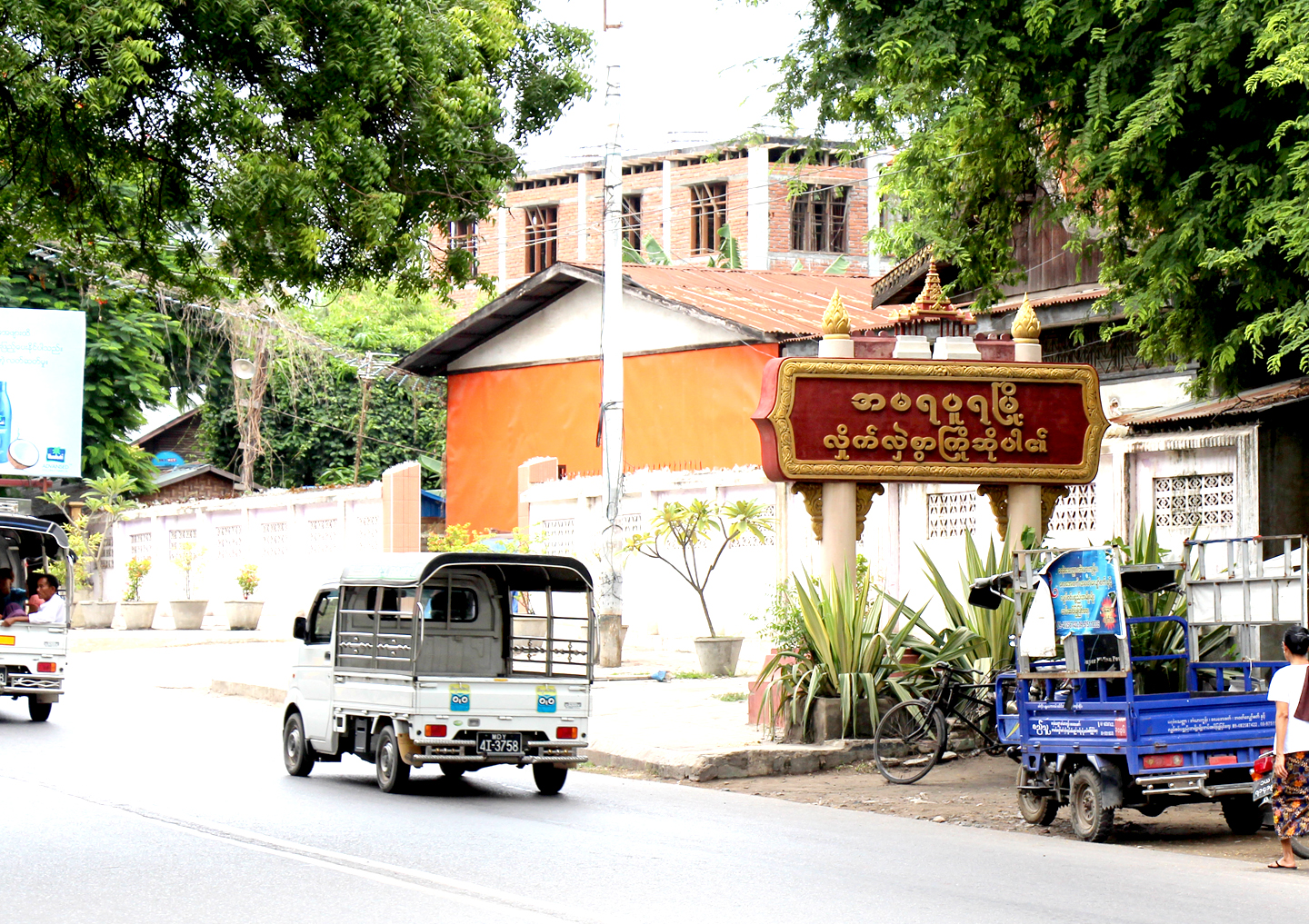
- Entrance to Amarapura

- Location in Burma
- Coordinates: 21°54′N 96°03′E
- Country: Myanmar
- Region: Mandalay
- District: Amarapura
- Township: Amarapura
- Founded: 13 May 1783

Population (2014)
  - Total: 237,618
- Time zone: UTC6:30 (MST)
- Area codes: 2 (mobile: 69, 90)

Amarapura (Burmese: အမရပူရ, romanized: aamarapuur, pronounced [ʔəməɹa̰pùɹa̰], lit. 'The Immortal City'; also spelt as Ummerapoora) is a former capital of Myanmar, and now a township of Mandalay city. Amarapura is bounded by the Irrawaddy River in the west, Chanmyathazi Township in the north, and the ancient capital site of Ava (Inwa) in the south. It was the capital of Myanmar twice during the Konbaung period (1783–1821 and 1842–1857) before finally being supplanted by Mandalay 11 kilometres (6.8 mi) north in 1859. It is historically referred to as Taungmyo (Southern City) in relation to Mandalay. Amarapura today is part of Mandalay, as a result of urban sprawl. The township is known today for its traditional silk and cotton weaving, and bronze casting. It is a popular tourist day-trip destination from Mandalay.

== Etymology ==
Amarapura comes from Pali: Amarapura (အမရပူရ), which means "The Immortal City".

== History ==
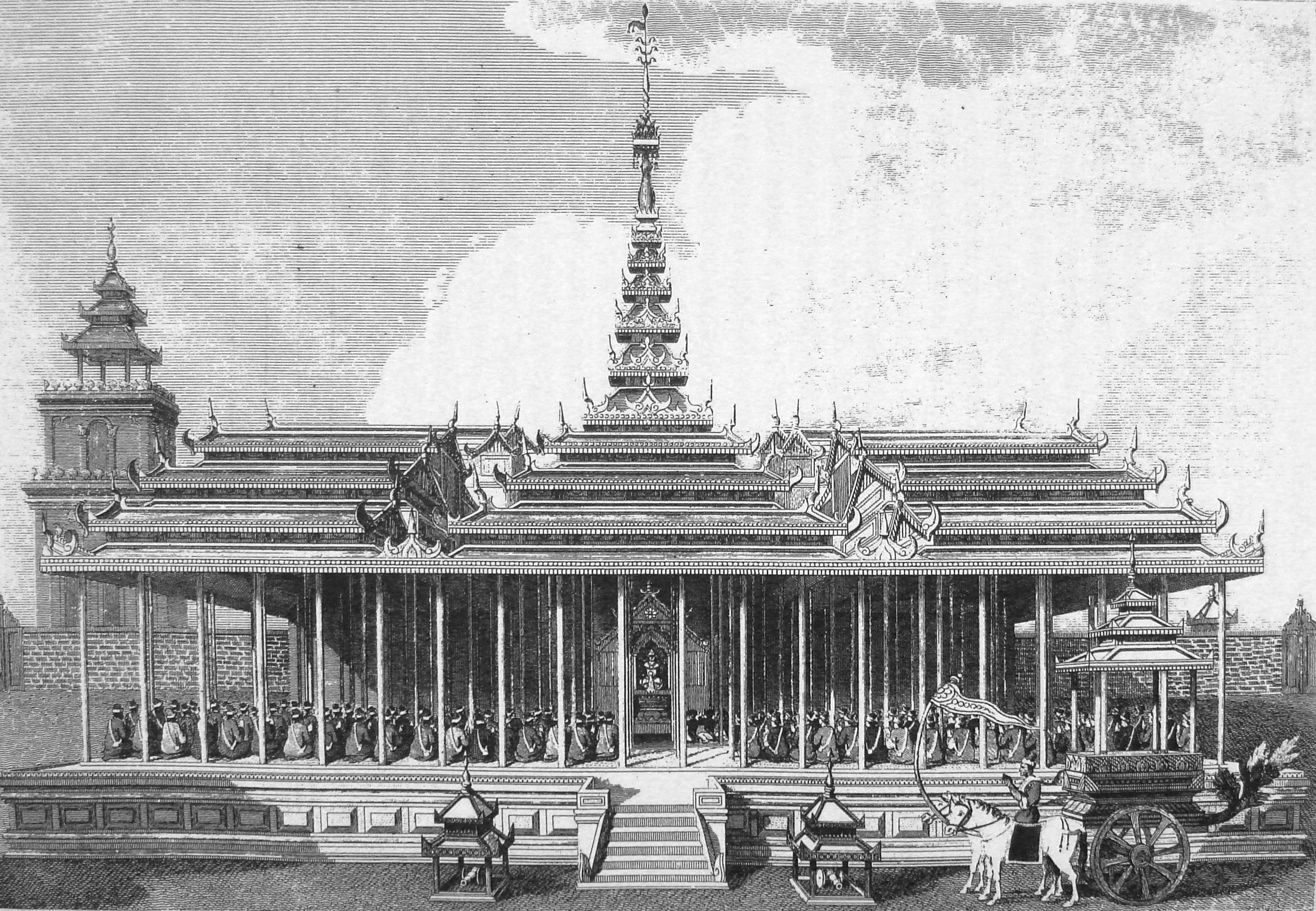
Royal palace of king Bodawpaya at Amarapura, during the visit of the British Embassy of Michael Symes, in 1795

Amarapura was founded by King Bodawpaya of the Konbaung Dynasty. He founded Amarapura as his new capital in May 1783. The new capital became a center of Buddhist reforms and learning. In 1800, Buddhist clergy from Sri Lanka obtained higher ordination in this city and founded the Amarapura Nikaya (Amarapura sect).

In 1810 the town was estimated to contain 170,000 inhabitants, but in that year it was destroyed by fire. Bodawpaya's grandson, King Bagyidaw moved the Court back to Ava in November 1821 and in 1827, the population of Amarapura was estimated at only 30,000. Bagyidaw's successor King Tharrawaddy again moved the royal capital back to Amarapura in February 1842. In February 1857, King Mindon began building Mandalay as his new capital city, 11 km north of Amarapura. With the royal treasury depleted by the Second Anglo-Burmese War of 1852, Mindon decided to reuse as much material from Amarapura as possible in the construction of Mandalay. The palace buildings were dismantled and moved by elephant to the new location, and the city walls were pulled down for use as building material for roads and railways. Part of the moat is still recognisable near the Bagaya Monastery. The city officially ceased being the capital on 23 May 1859 when Mandalay took over that role.

The ruins of the city wall show it to have been a square with a side of about three-quarters of a mile in length. At each corner stood a solid brick pagoda about 100 feet (30 m) high. The most remarkable edifice was a celebrated temple, adorned with 250 lofty pillars of gilt wood, and containing a colossal bronze statue of the Buddha.

The indigenous Burmese tradition of acheik textile weaving originates in Amarapura, and became popular during the Konbaung dynasty, during which sumptuary laws regulated who could wear acheik clothing. Amarapura, alongside Wundwin, remains a major domestic center of traditional acheik weaving, although in recent years, cheaper factory-produced imitations from China and India have significantly disrupted Myanmar's traditional cottage industry.

== Sights of interest ==
- Pahtodawgyi – A stupa built by King Bodawpaya in 1816 outside the city walls
- U Bein Bridge – a 1.2 km (0.75 mi) wooden footbridge (longest teak bridge in the world) built by the mayor U Bein salvaging the unwanted teak columns from the old palace during the move to Mandalay
- Kyauktawgyi Pagoda – A stupa built by King Pagan in 1847 at the farther end of U Bein's bridge
- Amarapura Palace ruins – containing tombs of King Bodawpaya and King Bagyidaw, and part of the old moat
- Maha Gandhayon Monastery – a large modern monastery complex with hundreds of monks and novices, well known throughout the country
- Kuanyin Si Temple – built in 1773 during King Singu's reign
- Yadanabon University – A major liberal arts university for students from Mandalay suburbs
- Nagayon Temple
- Mandalar Degree College – One of tourism and hospitality management college which co-operated with liberal arts major and well known for its diversities and students from different province.

== Photos ==
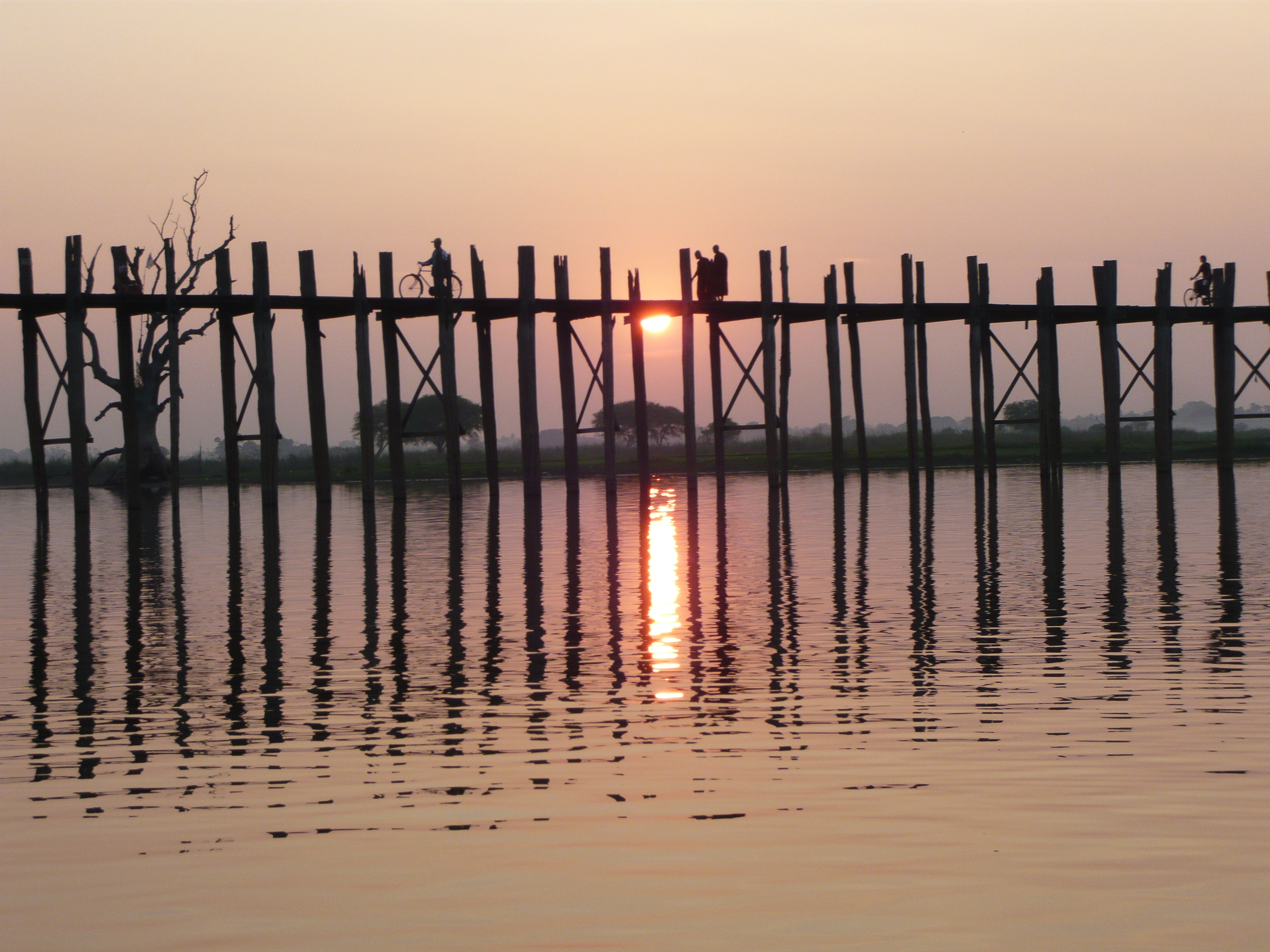
Monks Crossing U Bein Bridge at Sunset

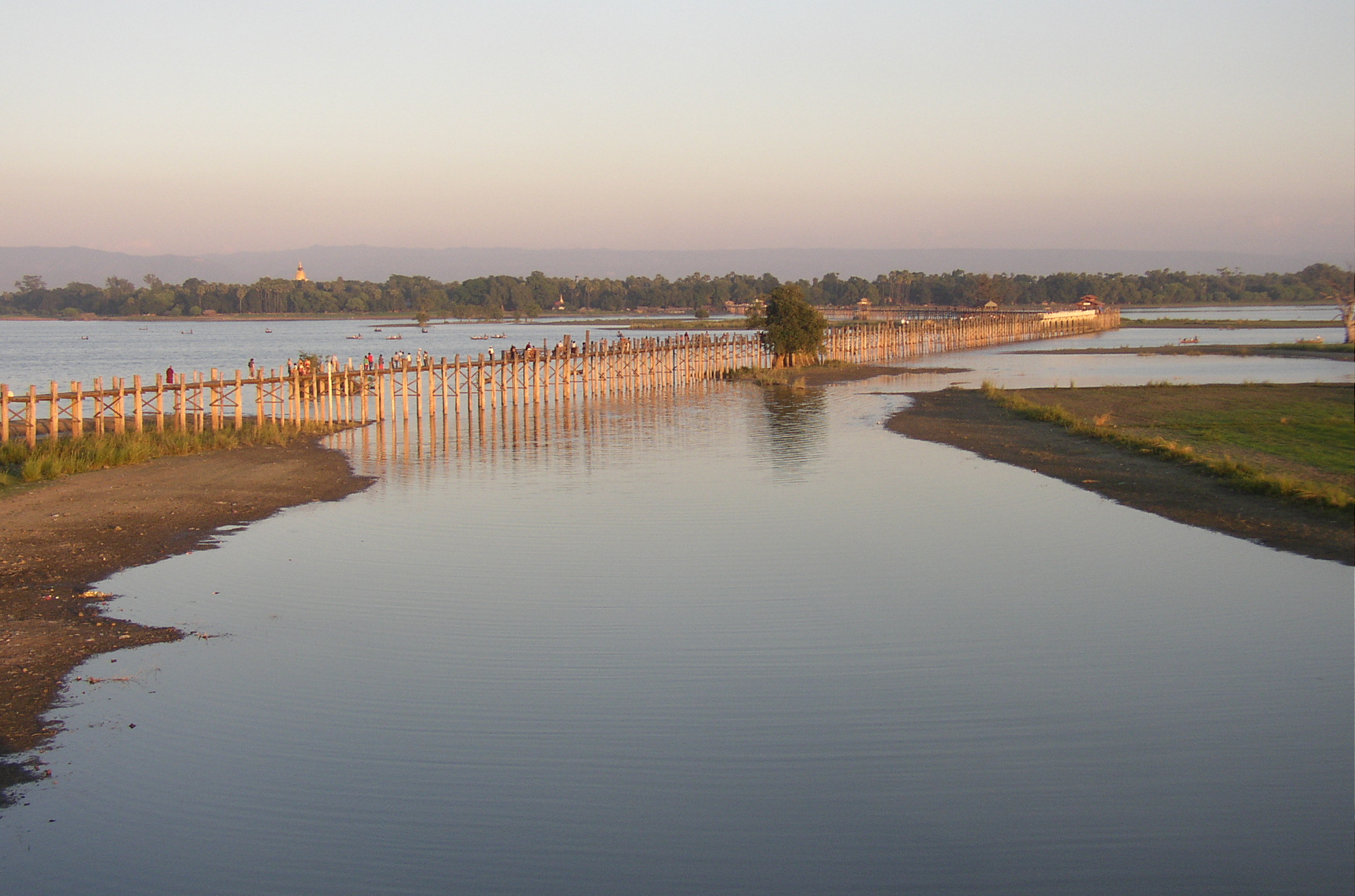
U Bein Bridge across the Taungthaman Lake

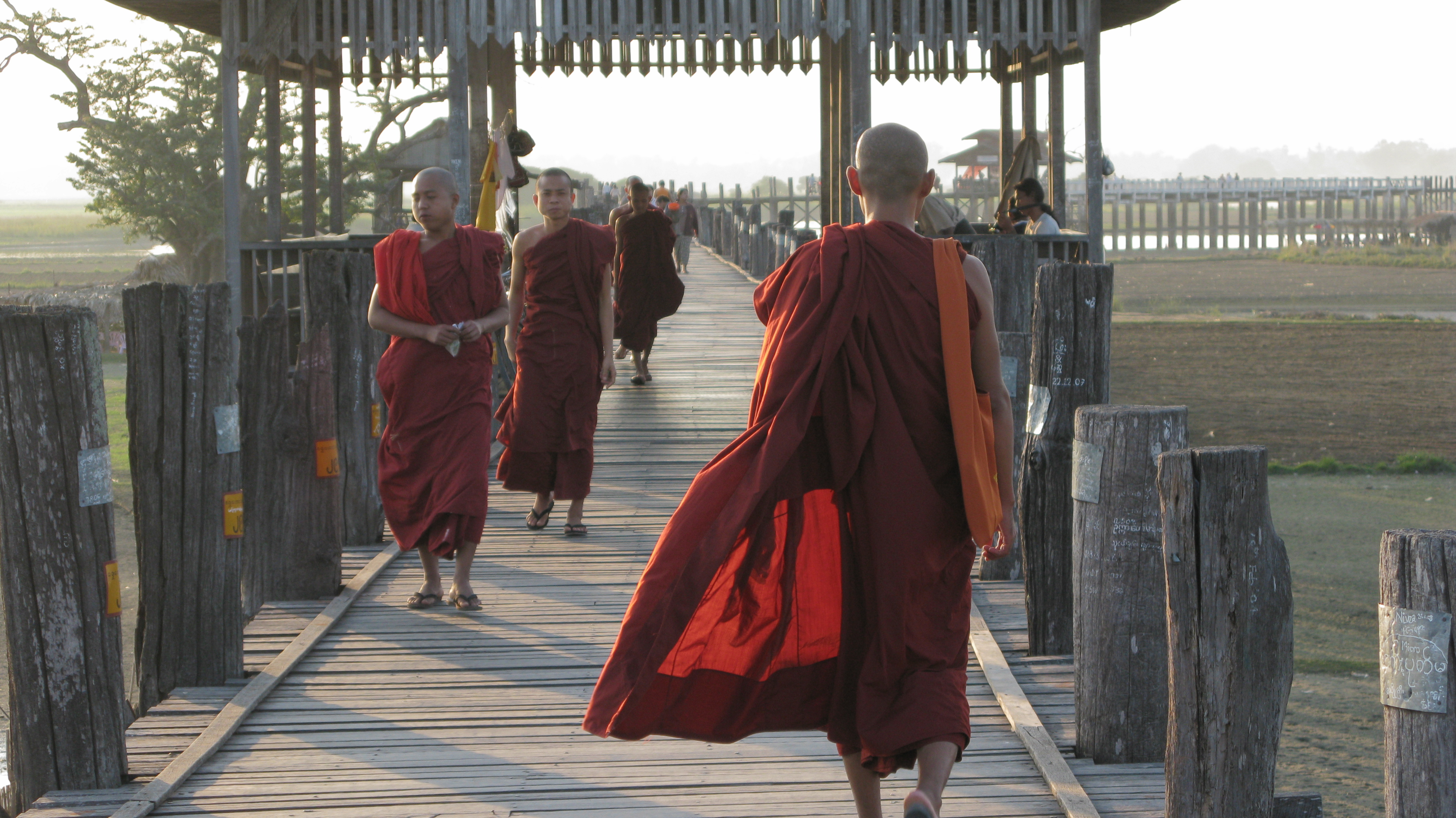
Buddhist monks on U Bein Bridge

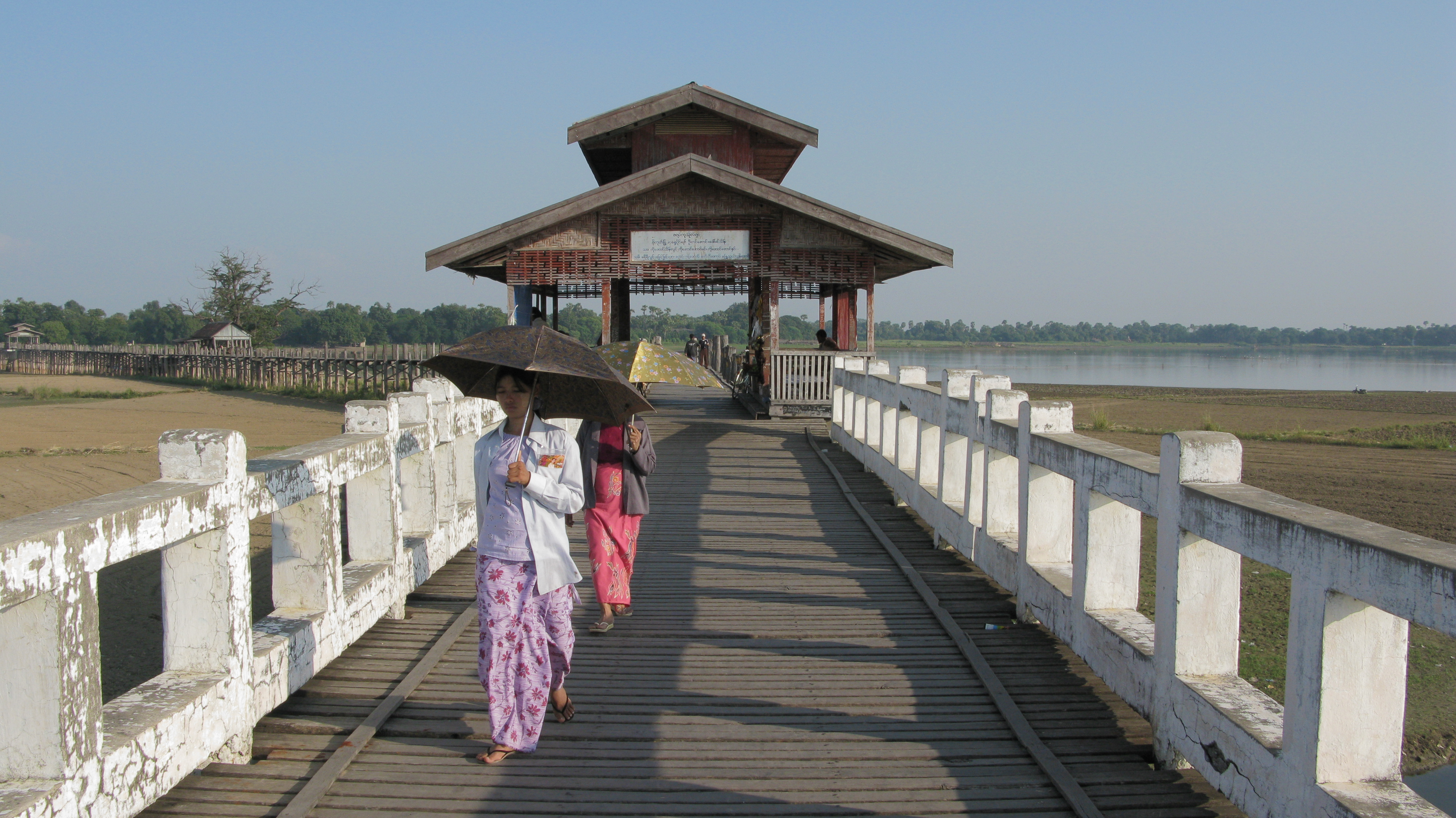
U Bein Bridge

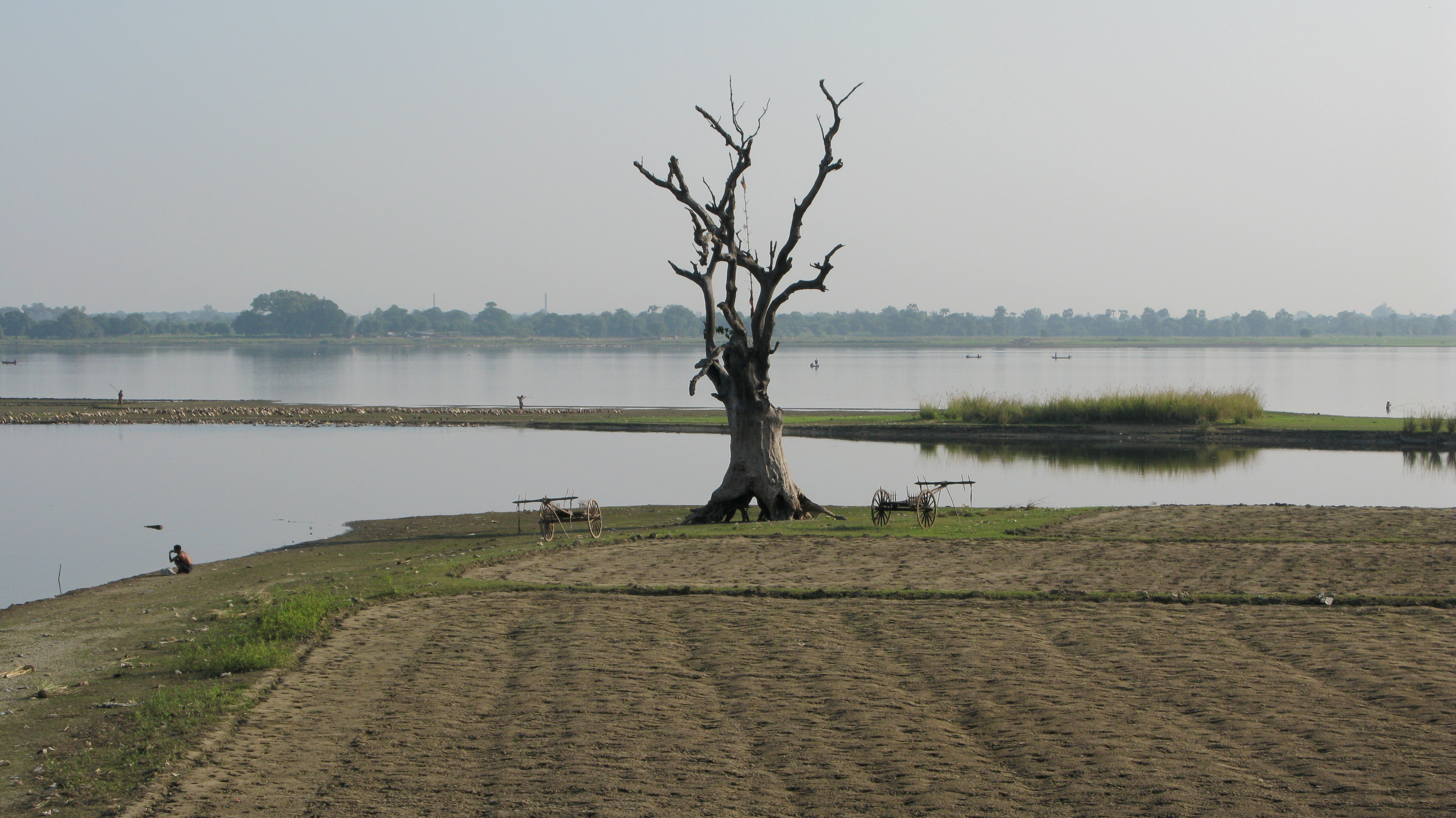
Taungthaman Lake, Amarapura

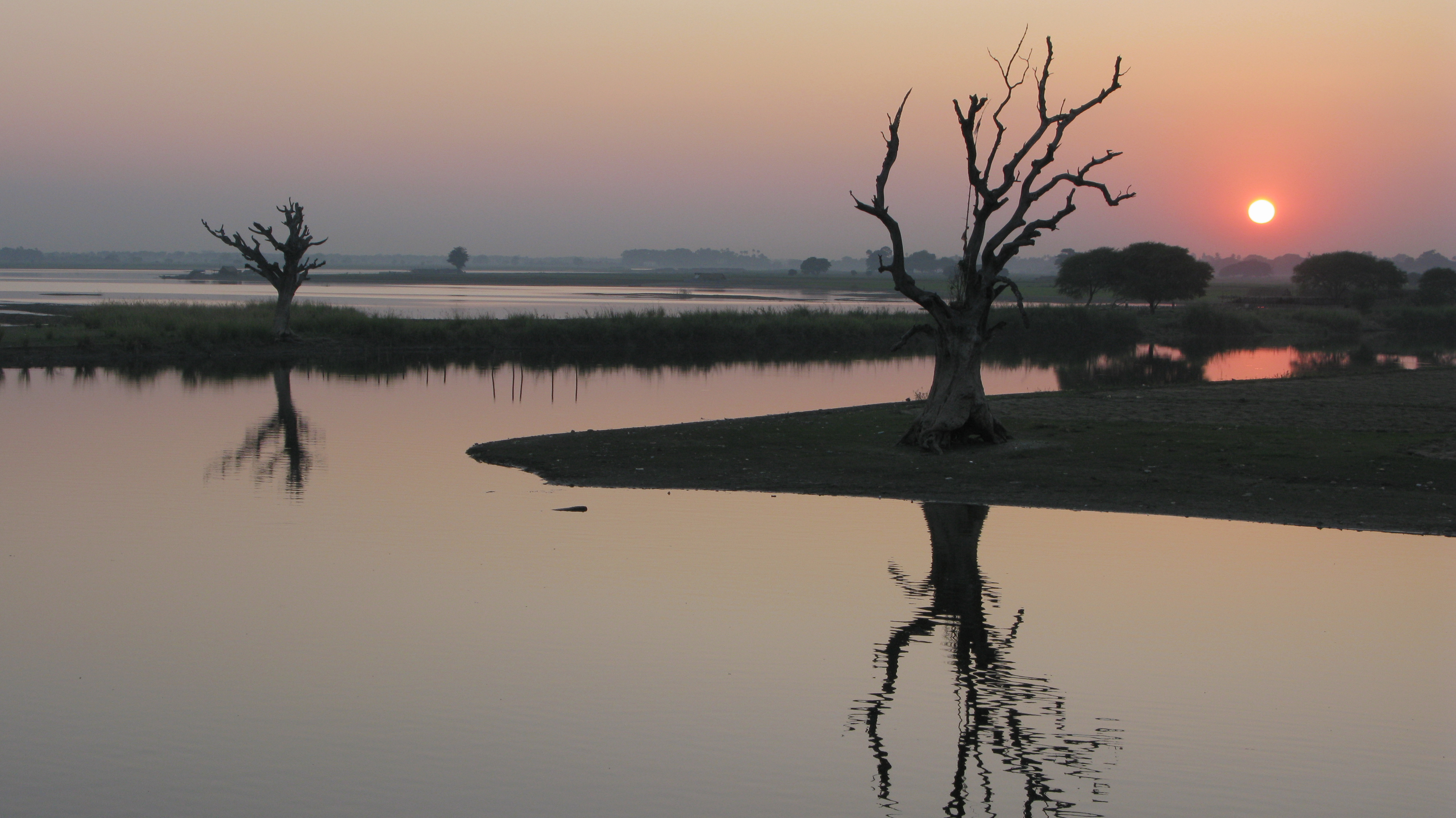
Sunset over Taungthaman Lake

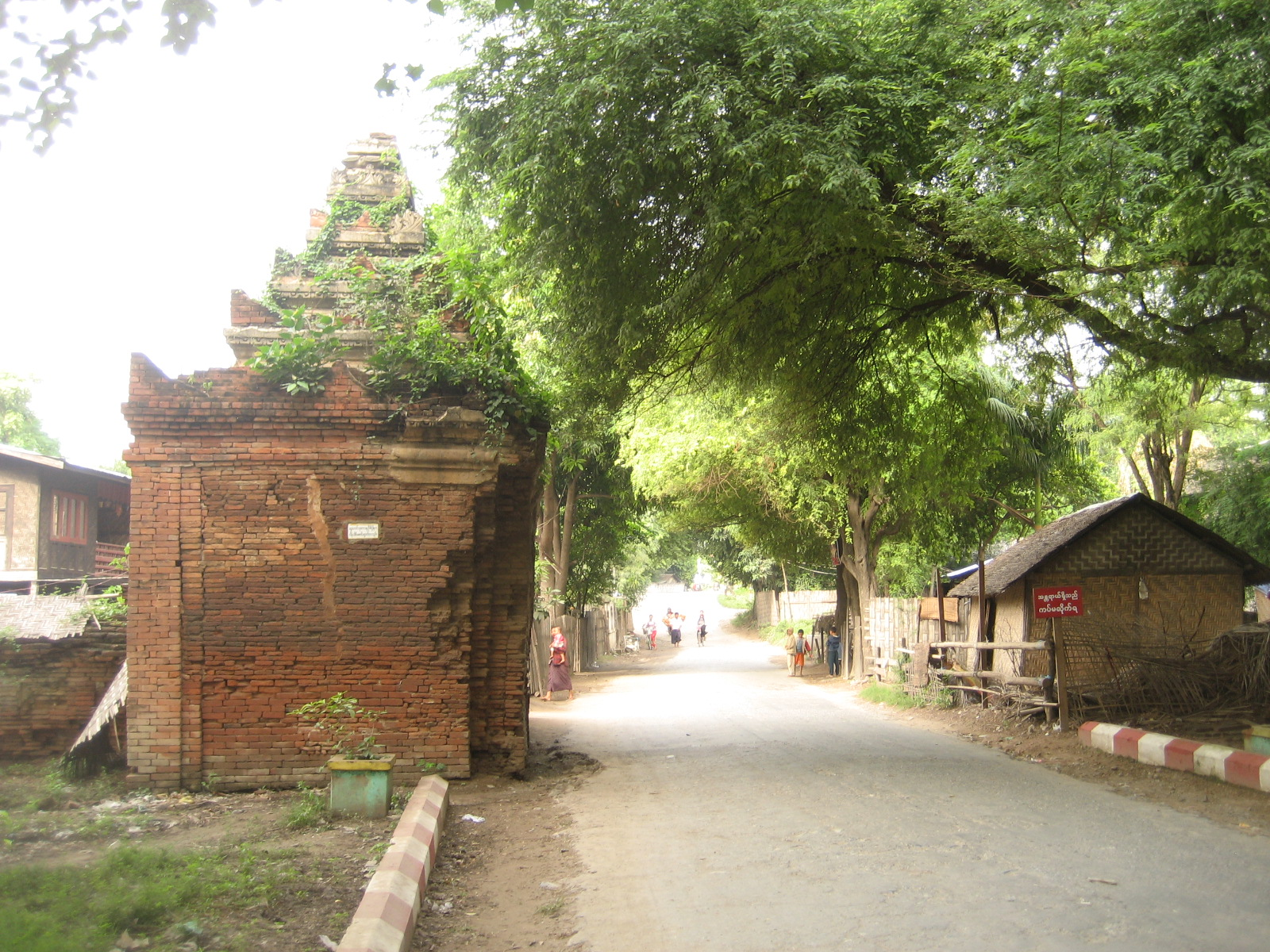
Old City Gate

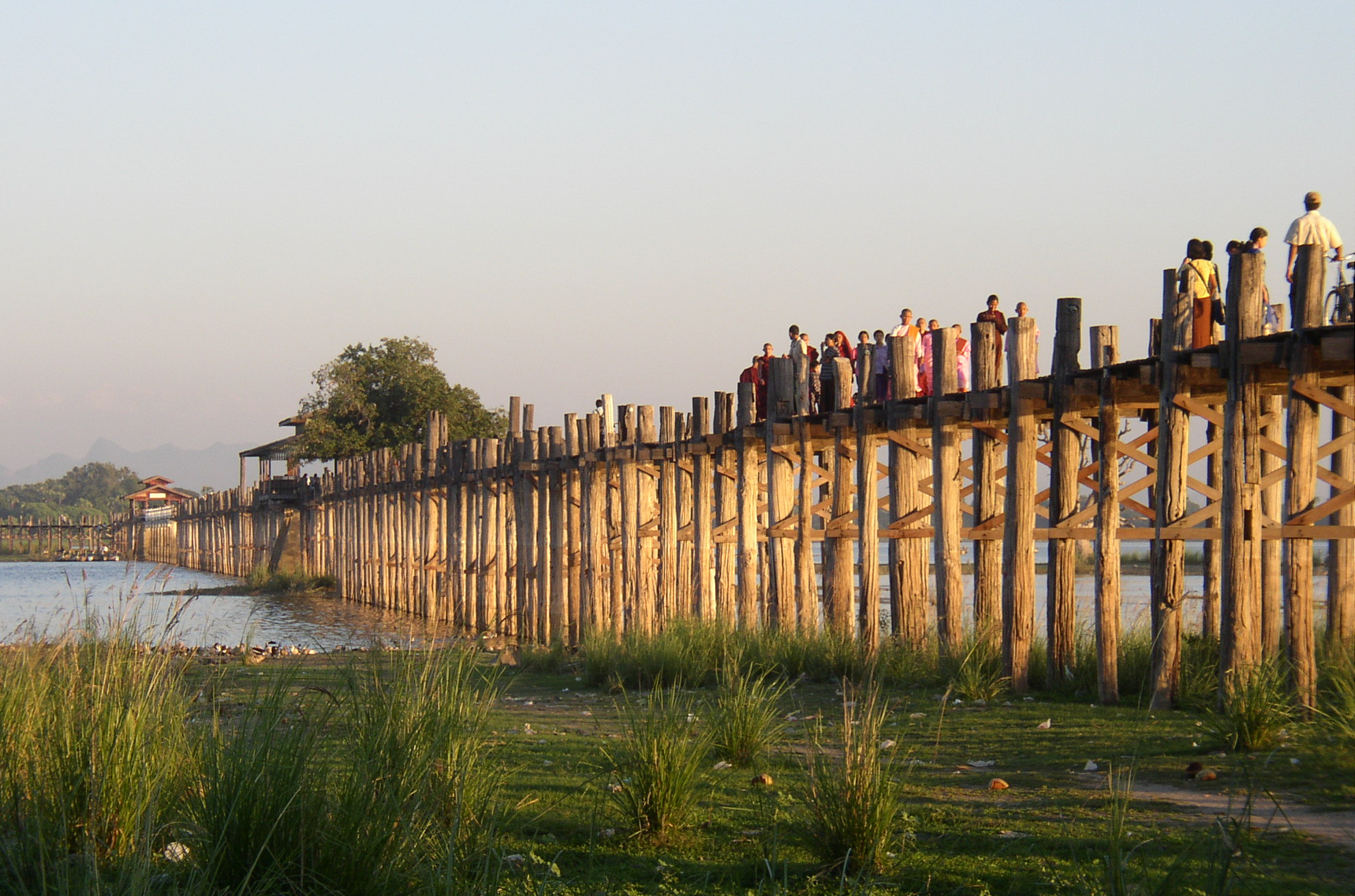
U Bein Bridge, detail

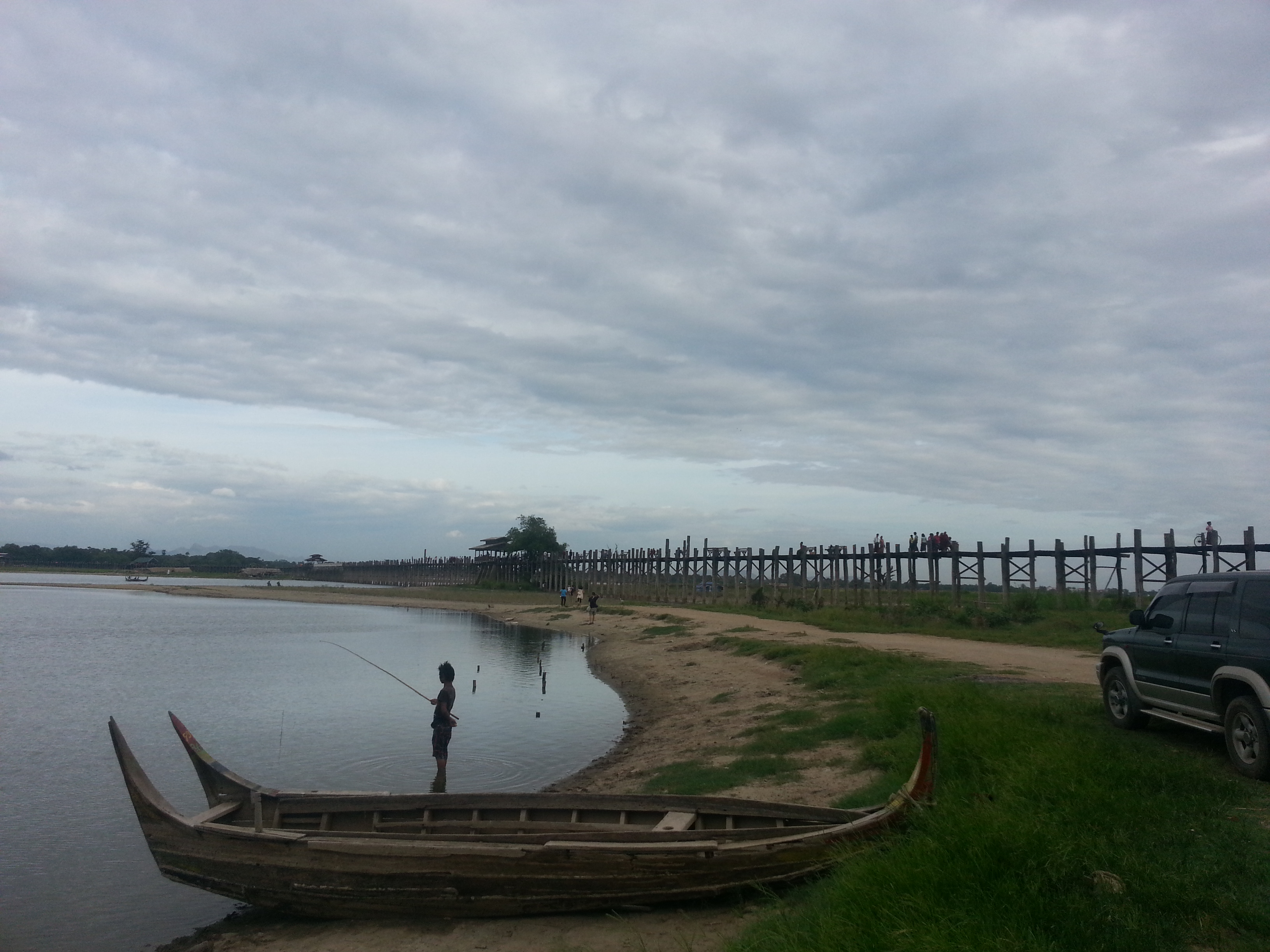
U Bein Bridge

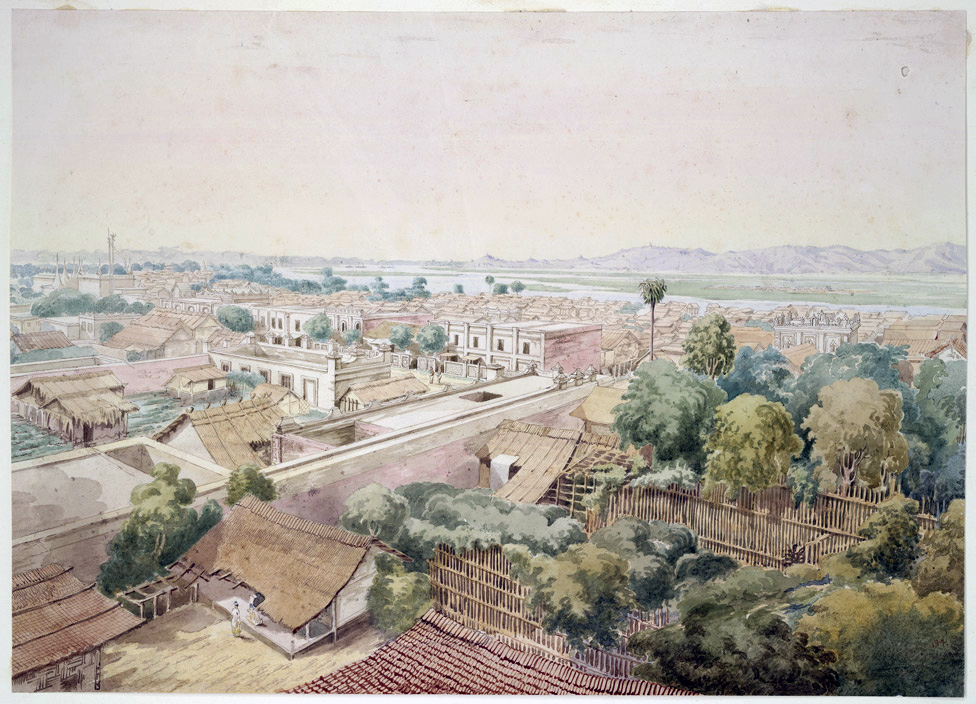
A panoramic view of Amarapura looking towards the south-west in 1855 by Colesworthey Grant

== Notes ==
Amarapura
Preceded by Ava	Capital of Burma; 13 May 1783 – 22 November 1821	Succeeded by Ava
Preceded by Ava	Capital of Burma; 10 February 1842 – 23 May 1859	Succeeded by Mandalay
