= School uniforms by country =

Use of school uniforms by country Uniforms are widespread Uniforms are not common

School uniforms in different countries
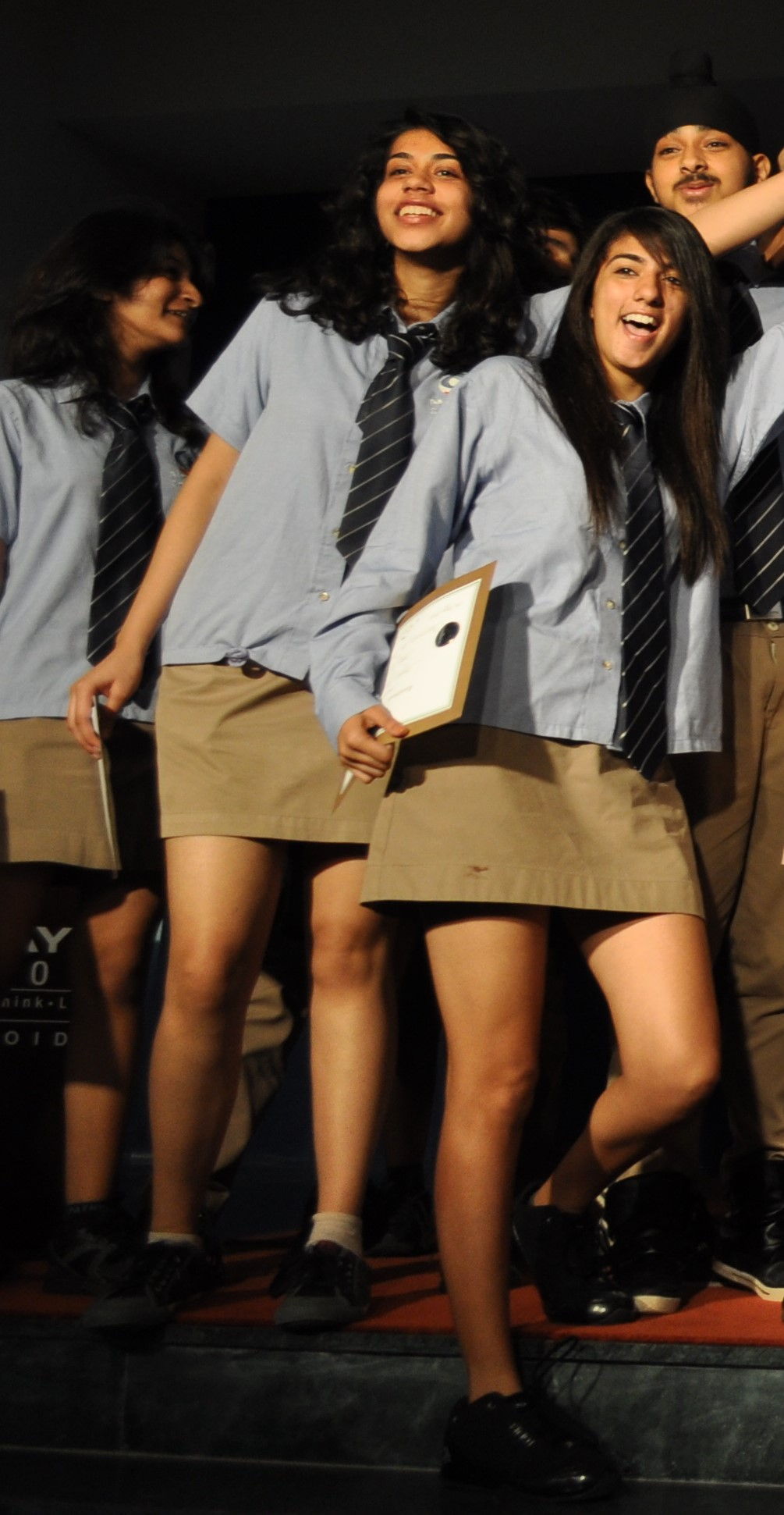
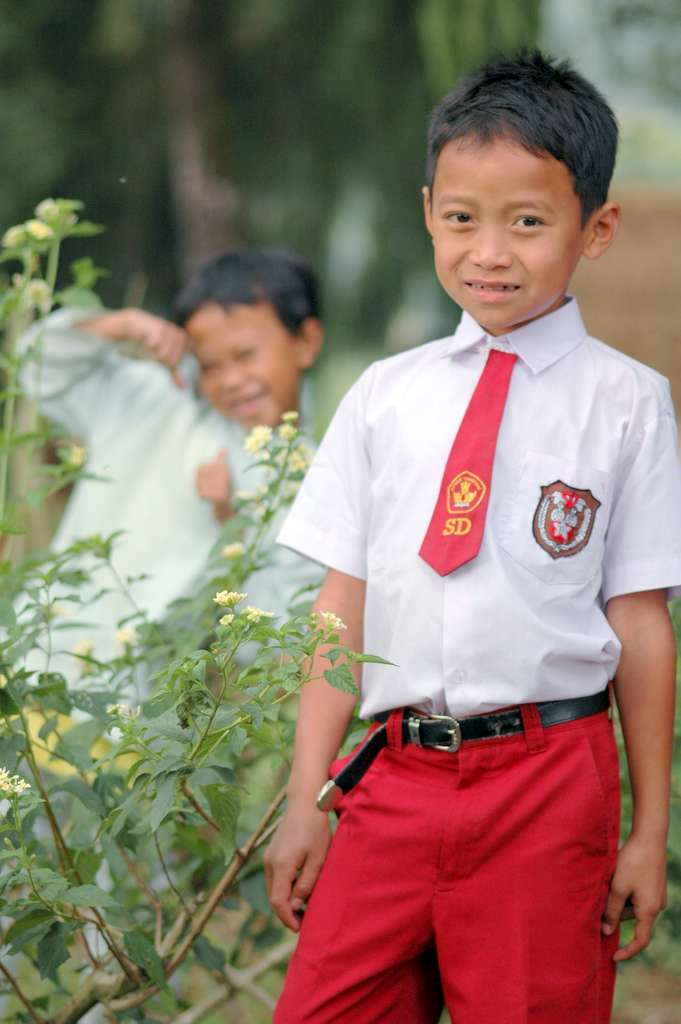
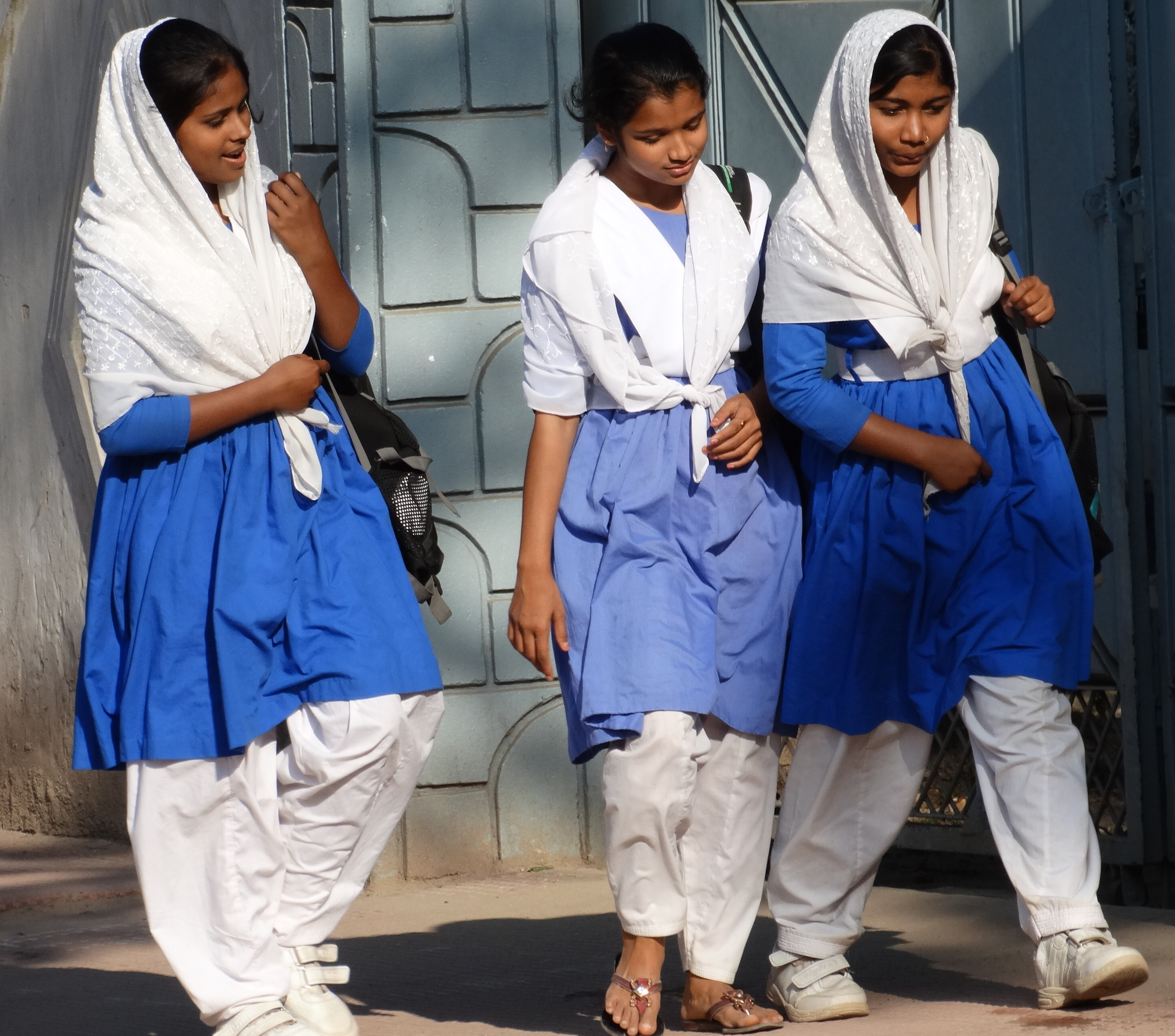

School uniform is a practice that dates to the 16th century in England. Charity schools such Christ's Hospital, founded in 1552 in London, were among the first schools to use a uniform for their students. The earliest documented proof of institutionalised use of a standard academic dress dates back to 1222 when the Archbishop of Canterbury ordered wearing of the cappa clausa.

The practice of wearing school uniform has been adopted by many other countries, and is now common in many parts of the world. Uniforms can be regarded as promoting social equality among students and an esprit de corps, but have also been criticised for promoting a form of uniformity characteristic of militarism.

The decision as to whether to implement school uniform policy or not is a controversial one and also polarised in societies and countries. In countries such as the United Kingdom, Australia, New Zealand, South Africa as well as a number of Asian nations, school children have to wear approved school uniforms that conform to the uniform policy of their school. In modern Europe, Britain, Malta and Ireland stand out as the only countries where school uniform is widely adopted by state schools and generally supported by local and national governments, although there is no legislation governing school uniform in the UK. There are some independent schools and state schools that do not have school uniforms: their pupils are at liberty to dress in a way considered to be appropriate by the school.

== Afghanistan ==
In the Islamic Republic of Afghanistan, Afghan schoolgirls were required to wear white headscarves and black knee-length dresses over leggings. In 2017, President Ashraf Ghani blocked a directive by the Ministry of Education obliging girls aged 12 and over to wear floor-length tunics.

== Albania ==
School uniforms have been compulsory in Albanian high schools since 2009.

== Algeria ==
Algerian primary school students are obliged to wear an apron over their clothes. These are colour-coded by gender: blue for boys, pink for girls.

== Andorra ==
School uniforms are not generally worn in Andorra. Their use is confined to the principality's international schools.

== Angola ==
Uniforms are required in Angolan public and private schools.

== Anguilla ==
Anguillan schools oblige students to wear uniforms.

== Antigua and Barbuda ==
School uniforms are ubiquitous in Antiguan and Barbudan schools. In 2004, the School Uniform Grant Programme was introduced to help citizens meet the associated costs.

== Argentina ==
Argentinian primary school students have traditionally worn white smocks as uniforms. Teacher Matilde Filgueiras pioneered the garment's design in 1915, which were made mandatory nationwide in 1942.

== Aruba ==
Aruban schools generally oblige students to wear uniform polo shirts, while pants and skirts must meet certain requirements. In September 2021, students at Colegio Arubano successfully protested against changes to the school dress code they felt were overly restrictive.

== Armenia ==
In the Armenian Soviet Socialist Republic, students wore school uniform. Since independence in 1991, their use has largely declined in Armenian public schools.

== Australia ==
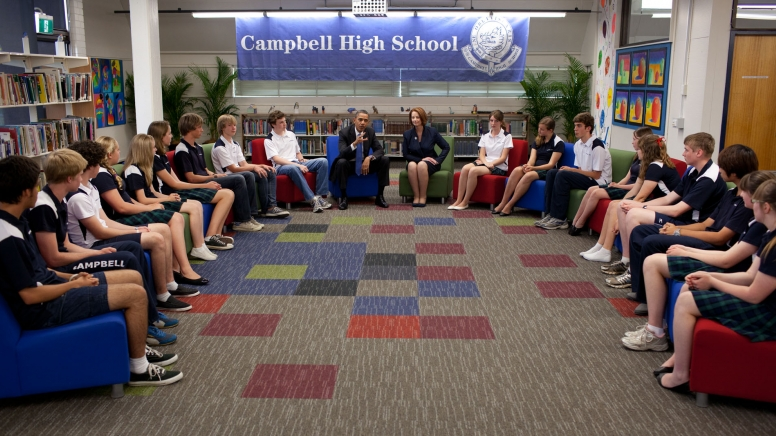
Barack Obama and Julia Gillard with students at an Australian high school in 2011.

In Australia, each school or school system can set its own uniform policy. Wearing a uniform is compulsory in most Australian private and all Catholic schools, as well as in most public schools, as well as primary schools. Uniforms usually have a colour scheme based on the school colours. Most, if not all, private schools have the school logo incorporated in the uniform ensemble, typically on the tie and the blazer breast pocket.

For boys, the uniforms generally include a button-up or polo shirt with either shorts (especially for summer wear) or long trousers, usually in grey, navy blue or the school colour. Some schools allow boys to wear shorts only in younger years, and they must wear long trousers once they are a senior (17–18). At others, even older boys wear shorts in summer due to the heat. Where short trousers are to be worn, socks in school colours (more commonly white) are often required. Girls' uniforms generally include a checkered or striped dress (usually sleeveless or short-sleeved) worn over a blouse for summer and, in most secondary schools, girls wear a skirt as well as a button-up or polo shirt in winter with a blazer and tie. In a number of schools, girls are also permitted to wear a button-up or polo shirt and dark trousers.

In public schools, the uniform is usually a polo shirt for juniors and a different one for seniors and trousers or skirt. This set may be complemented by a school tie and, typically, a v-neck jumper (pullover or sweater) or a blazer. In the summer, boys usually do not wear ties, jumpers, or blazers. Instead, they wear a short-sleeved version of the shirt and short trousers. A neck-tie, blazer, and hat are also common in private and Catholic schools.

In most high schools a PE uniform is the norm for sports days only. At many high schools, children are required to change into and out of their PE uniform around the PE lesson. The PE uniform usually consists of shorts and a polo shirt, as well as a light weatherproof rain jacket (mainly at private or Catholic schools), usually made of polyester, for winter and wet weather and sometimes a netball skirt for girls. It is common for students in their final year of primary school or secondary school to have their own jersey, jumper or jacket to denote their final-year status.

=== Christmas Island ===
School uniform is compulsory at Christmas Island District High School, the island's only secondary school.

=== Cocos (Keeling) Islands ===
School uniform is compulsory at Cocos Islands District High School, the territory's only secondary school.

=== Norfolk Island ===
School uniform is compulsory at Norfolk Island Central School, the island's only school.

== Austria ==
Austrian public schools do not generally employ dress codes.

== Azerbaijan ==
School uniforms are mandatory across the Azerbaijani public school system.

== Bahamas ==
School uniforms are worn throughout Bahamian public and private school systems.

== Bahrain ==
Uniforms are mandatory in all Bahraini public schools. Prior to 2011, this only applied to girls' schools and boys' elementaries. In January 2011, the Ministry of Education announced uniforms would be required in boys' middle and high schools in the subsequent academic year.

== Bangladesh ==
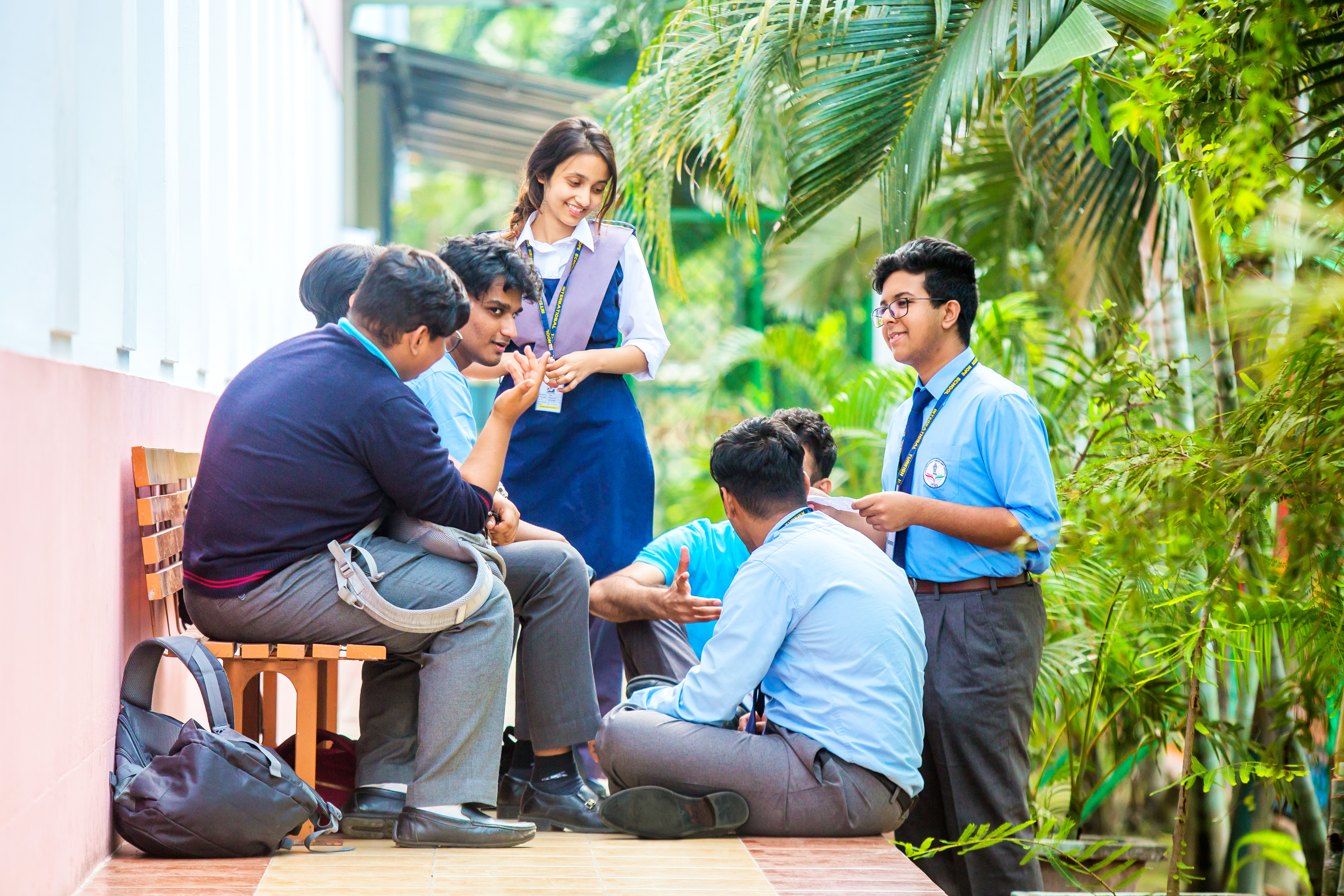
School uniforms of the students of International Hope School Bangladesh. While male uniforms are almost universal, female school uniforms may be chosen between shirts & skirts and salwar kameez in most institutions.

School uniforms are mandatory in all public and private schools (up to 12th standard) in Bangladesh. While the colour and exact cut of the uniform depend on school regulations and policies, male students in Bangladesh are usually expected to wear full/half sleeve shirts with trousers and female students are expected to wear skirts/trousers with shirts or salwar kameez with belts and dupattas.

The uniform rule only applies to students of primary, secondary, and higher secondary education. Although there are no uniforms for university students in Bangladesh, they are expected to follow the respective dress codes of their institutions.

The rationale behind the uniform policy of Bangladesh is that the authorities want to protect the students from class stratification that can become apparent when students are given the choice to dress as they like. In addition, authorities believe that students should not misuse their time in trying to dress up for school.

== Barbados ==
School uniforms are mandatory in Bajan schools.

== Belarus ==
In August 2022, education minister Andrei Ivanyets announced plans for every Belarusian school to have its own compulsory school uniform by 2023. In 2024, select schools in Minsk participated in a pilot scheme for a standardised school uniform. Since 15 April 2025, each school in Belarus has been obligated to choose a uniform from a list of brands which are part of the state-owned Bellegprom concern.

== Belgium ==
As of 2018, less than ten Belgian schools (principally Catholic institutions such as Collège Saint-Benoît de Maredsous) enforced compulsory school uniform policies.

== Belize ==
School uniform is mandatory in Belizean schools. Traditionally, many students' uniforms were custom-made by local seamstresses and tailors.

== Benin ==
School uniform is ubiquitous in Beninese schools. In June 2018, Minister of Secondary Education Mahougnon Kakpo announced khaki-coloured uniforms would be worn by students in both public and private secondary schools.

== Bermuda ==
As a British Overseas Territory, schools uniforms are ubiquitous in Bermudan schools.

== Bhutan ==
Bhutanese schoolchildren wear uniforms based on the country's national dress: gho for male students and kira for female students.

== Bolivia ==
Schools uniforms are worn in most Bolivian schools. However, schools cannot legally stop students who refuse to wear uniform from attending classes.

== Bosnia and Herzegovina ==
In the Socialist Federal Republic of Yugoslavia, some schools enforced a mandatory uniform consisting of a navy blue "apron".

As of 2013, several primary schools in Republika Srpska regions had introduced uniforms, consisting of logoed T-shirts and sweatshirts.

== Botswana ==
School uniforms are widespread in Botswanan schools. In October 2021, the Ministry of Investment, Trade and Industry announced a ban on the importation of school uniform.

== Brazil ==
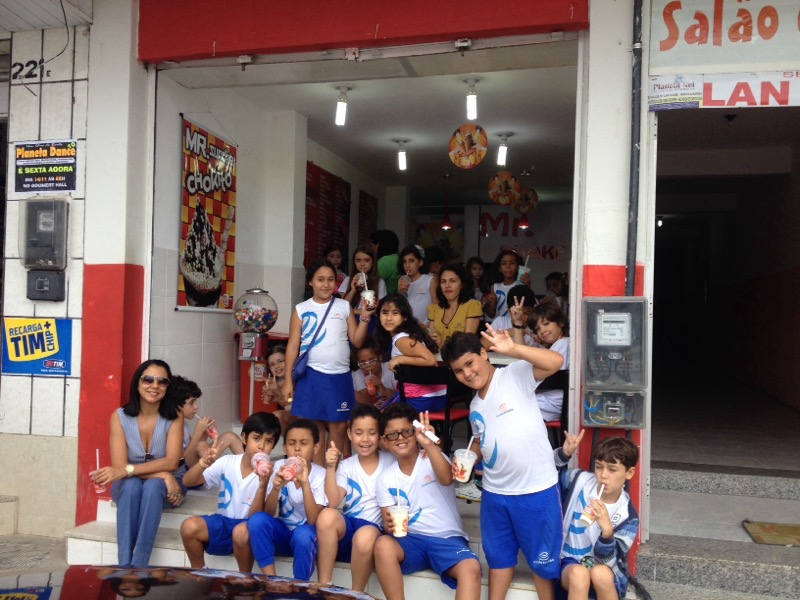
Brazilian primary school students with their teacher.

There is no legal requirement for school uniforms in Brazil. On a state-by-state or city-by-city basis, governments may issue uniforms to public school pupils but may not require their use. Private schools are free to set their own uniform policy.

Brazilian school uniforms can vary widely by school. There are many schools that opt for a more elegant outfit, while others opt for a simpler one (social shirt, shorts). In this country, where schools have set a uniform, it is the student's obligation to wear it.

Most schools in Brazil choose the use of uniforms. The average Brazilian school uniform for boys is a T-shirt with the school's logo, sweatpants or Bermuda shorts and a sweatshirt or hoodie. The uniform for girls is very similar, but instead leggings or short shorts are worn, although ballerina pants are also popular. Girls may also wear mini-skirts/skirts. Most schools require trainers.

== British Virgin Islands ==
Both public high schools on the British Virgin Islands, Elmore Stoutt High School and The Virgin Islands School of Technical Studies, enforce uniform policies.

== Brunei ==
School uniforms are worn in Bruneian public and religious schools.

- Boys: shirt, pants, songkok
- Girls: Baju kurung, hijab

== Bulgaria ==
School uniform is not widely worn in Bulgarian public schools, although several schools adopted compulsory uniform policies in the 2010s.

== Burkina Faso ==
Uniforms are compulsory in all Burkinabè public and private schools.

== Burundi ==
School uniforms are compulsory for school children in Burundi. Burundi, like most African countries, has a compulsory school uniform policy. Burundi's school uniform policy dates back to the colonial days. During those days, chiefs' sons wore a white uniform and all other children wore khaki. The uniform policy is still in force in Burundi to date. However, schools decide on what uniform the pupils wear. It is also argued that the cost of buying the school uniform and poverty, especially in the rural areas, negatively affect school enrollment.

== Cambodia ==
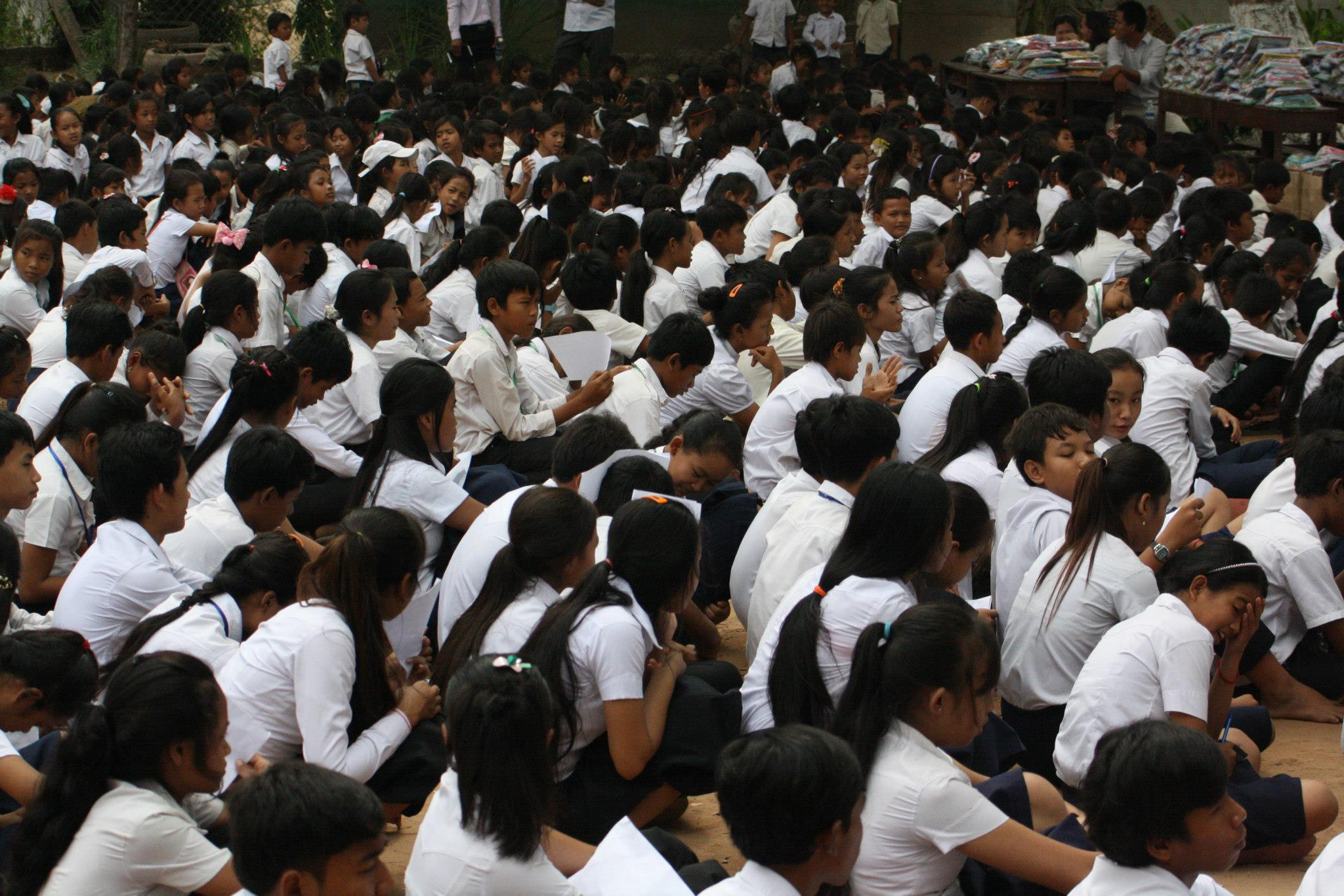
School children wearing uniforms in Cambodia

In Cambodia, students of all ages (pre-school to college) wear school uniforms. The uniforms differ by school and age level. Generally, boys wear a white dress shirt and a pair of shorts. The colour and length of the shorts varies at each school. Male college students wear the same kind of uniform, but instead of shorts, they wear black dress trousers. Girls usually wear white blouses and a skirt. Their skirts vary in colour and length depending upon the school and their ages. Generally, the younger students wear long skirts that almost reach their ankles and older students, particularly in college, wear shorter ones. Skirts are generally blue or black but may be other colours as well, depending on the school. Some schools also have alternative uniforms that students of both sexes wear every other day. These often consist of a coloured shirt and slacks. High school girls must wear black or blue long skirts. High school boys wear long black or blue trousers. The white shirt can be short-sleeved or long-sleeved for both sexes. High school students are also required to wear name tags on the left-hand side of their shirts.

== Cameroon ==
School uniforms are worn universally in Cameroonian schools.

== Canada ==
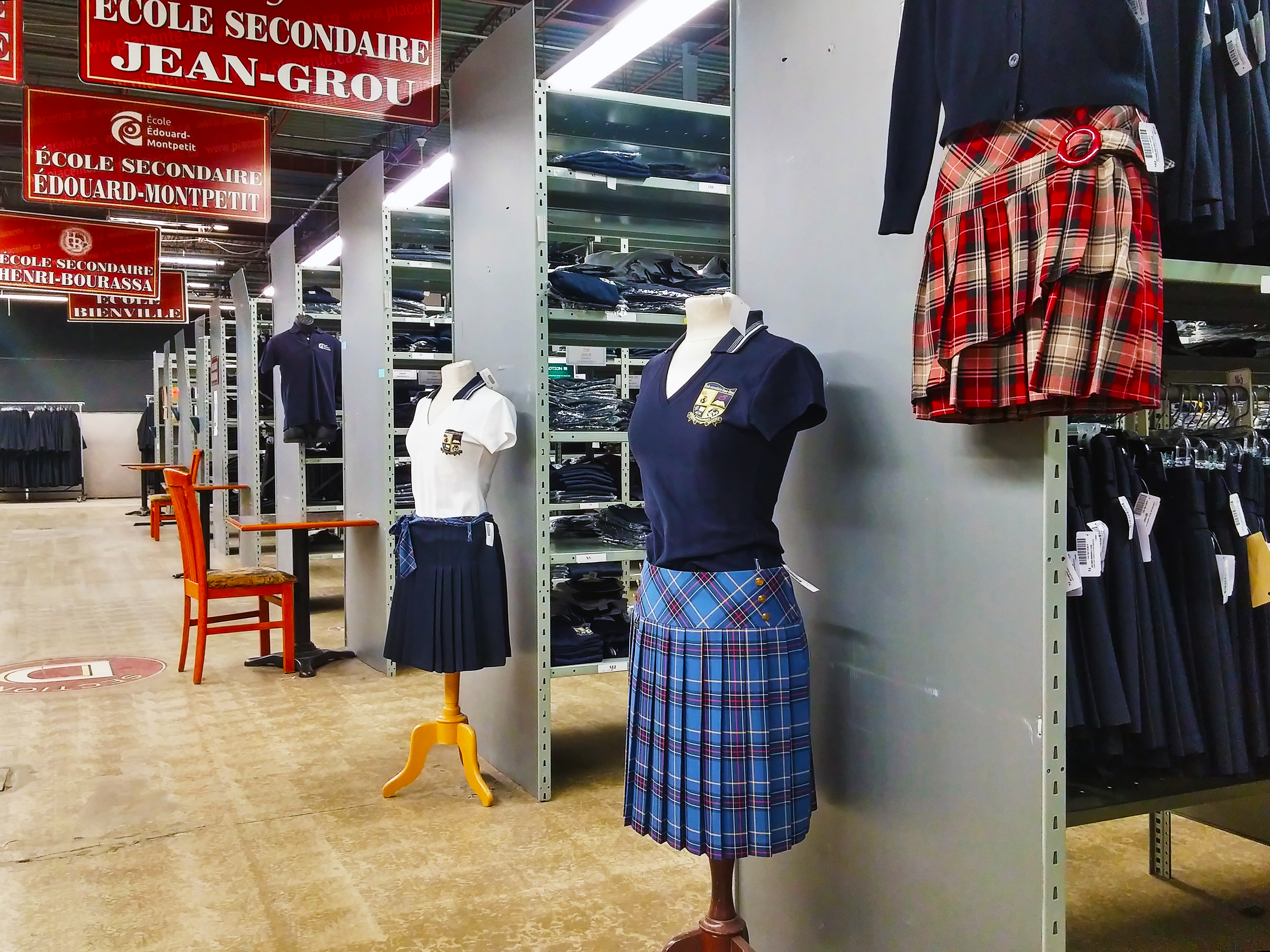
French-language secondary schools uniforms on sale at a warehouse store in Montreal, Quebec.

In Canada, provinces have exclusive jurisdiction over education and schools and decision with regard to mandatory uniforms are generally left to either school boards or individual schools. In general, public schools, who may have a dress code, do not have mandatory uniforms. The exception is Quebec, where French-language primary and secondary schools, especially in Montreal and Quebec City, have gradually been adopting mandatory uniform codes since the mid- 2000s. By 2015, 21 of the 29 secondary schools of Montreal's main French-language school board had implemented mandatory uniform code. In the province's English public school sector most high schools have gradually adopted such a code, some waiting until 2022 and 2023 to do so.

In the rest of Canada, school uniforms are not required in most public schools or separate schools, except in exceptional circumstances such as school performances or international field trips. However, the majority of Catholic high schools in southern Ontario (Grade 9–12) do require uniforms. These uniforms generally have long- or short-sleeved shirts with the school logo or crest near the collar and trousers or kilted skirts. Schools often allow girls the option of choosing to wear a skirt or trousers. Some schools also mandate dress shoes and a particular type and length of socks to go with the uniform. A cardigan sweater, vest, or blazer may be part of the ensemble, particularly in winter. Additionally, as of 2011, the Toronto Catholic District School Board has implemented an Appropriate Dress Code of navy blue and white in all elementary separate schools that do not already have their own uniforms.

Otherwise, specific regulations and policies regarding school-appropriate dress and the extent of dress code enforcement will vary by school.

Uniforms are used in most private schools, and also in special or alternative programs of public and Catholic schools.

== Cape Verde ==
School uniform is worn in Cape Verdean schools from pre-school through secondary school.

== Cayman Islands ==
All Caymanian primary and high schools, whether government-funded or private, have specified school uniforms, as well as shoe and hat policies.

== Central African Republic ==
In April 1979, Bokassa I ordered the arrest of a group of students protesting the extravagant cost of their mandatory school uniforms, over 100 of whom were later murdered. Public anger over the massacre contributed to Bokassa's subsequent overthrow in September 1980. As of 2006, school uniforms are widely worn in Central African secondary schools.

== Chad ==
A school uniform prescribed by the Ministry of National Education is compulsory in Chadian public and private schools.

== Chile ==
In Chile, most schools have a uniform.

Until 1930, it was uncommon for students to wear a uniform. Under the government of Carlos Ibáñez del Campo, all students became obliged to wear a school uniform. During the administration of Eduardo Frei Montalva, a unified uniform was introduced for all public and private schools and other education centers. Today, these uniforms have disappeared in private schools, who prefer to use a customised one.

== China ==
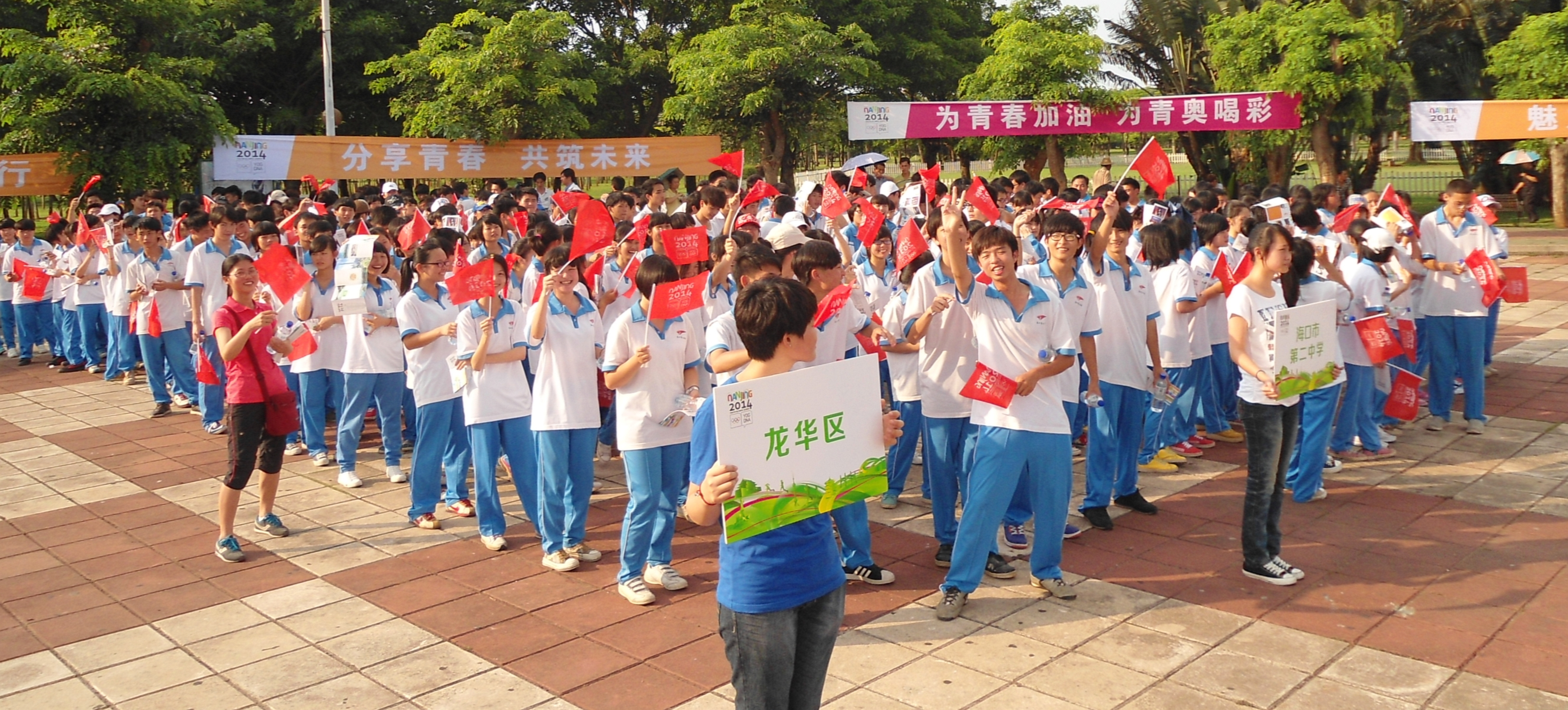
Chinese high school students in their summer school uniforms.

Uniforms are a common part of the schools in China. Almost all secondary schools as well as some elementary schools require students to wear uniforms. Uniforms in mainland China usually consist of five sets: 2 formal sets and 3 everyday sets. A formal set is worn on Mondays or special occasions (school anniversaries, school ceremonies, etc.) They consist of a white collared shirt with a sweater on top and a skirt for girls or a suit for boys. There is one formal set for summer and one set for winter. Everyday uniforms for boys in the winter usually consist of a zippered sweater and trousers and a collared shirt (usually white). Thinner materials are worn in the spring and fall and short or long trousers may be worn in the summer. The everyday uniforms for girls are very similar to the boys' uniform. It is relatively common for there to be some kind of sponsored advertisement on some non-formal school uniform shirts, though this trend has fluctuated in recent years.

=== Shenzhen ===
In 2002, Shenzhen became the first prefectural-level city to unify the school uniforms in public schools citywide, which becomes an important recognitive symbol of Shenzheners. Private schools such as Shenzhen Yaohua Experimental School has its own uniform.

Student uniforms in Shenzhen are enfirmed by standard number T/XFBZ 002-2019. The informal wear ("sportswear") consist of:

- A polo shirt with the collar in secondary color, as well as two lines on top of both sleeves extending to the end for primary students, or sideways for secondary school students. Boys wear blue-and-white shirts, while girls wear white-and-blue shirts.
- A zipped jacket for winter, in the matching color of polo shirt for primary school students, or white and deep blue per wavy bend sinister unisex for secondary school students.
- Blue shorts (unisex, also below) with two white vertical bars each side, or
- Trousers, blue with one thick bar (primary), or dark blue with thick and thin bars (secondary).

Informal pieces of student uniforms in Shenzhen are sold beyond Shenzhen, and even to Beijing and Taiwan.

Formal wear also exists but is rarely used.

=== Hong Kong ===
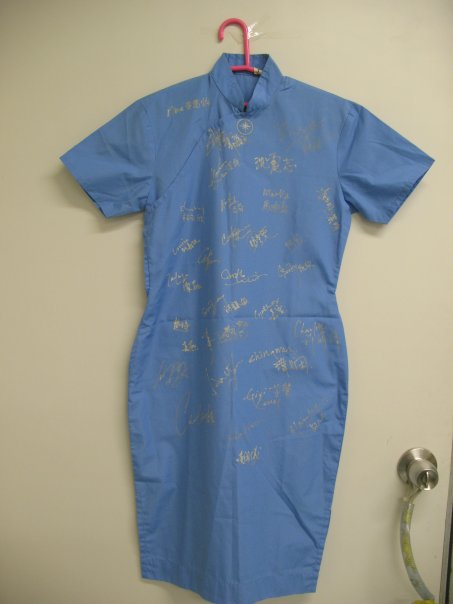
Cheongsam as School Uniform. Note- uniform is plain – markings are signatures of owner's classmates.

The vast majority of schools in the former British colony adopted uniforms similar to that of British schools, while Catholic schools in Hong Kong usually follow the tradition of Catholic school uniforms.

A number of older Christian girls' schools established around the midpoint of the 20th century, however, retain the heritage of using the Chinese cheongsam as their uniform, such as St. Stephen's Girls' College, True Light Middle School, Ying Wa Girls' School, and Heep Yunn School. Sailor suits are also used as uniforms in some kindergartens for boys and girls, and secondary schools but for girls only, for example the Bishop Hall Jubilee School and New Method College.

St Paul's Girls' College, now St Paul's Co-educational College, introduced a cheongsam as its uniform in 1918, making it Hong Kong's first school uniform. True Light Girls' College was the first Hong Kong secondary school to have a cheongsam uniform.

While Hong Kong campuses of British public schools use hats for reasons of tradition, most Hong Kong schools have no hats in their uniforms.

=== Macau ===
School uniforms are worn in Macanese schools from kindergarten onwards.

== Colombia ==
In Colombia, all students are required to wear uniforms in public and private schools. The styles of uniform vary regionally but all consist of three sets: an everyday uniform, a sports uniform for physical education, and a "gala uniform" (Spanish:uniforme de gala) for formal school events, such as patriotic days and important national dates.

- Everyday uniform
  - Girls
    - White T-shirt with a vest
    - Knee-length skirt and white calf-length socks
  - Boys
    - White T-shirt, usually with the school's symbol on the left side.
    - Dark-coloured long trousers

With gala uniforms, the T-shirt is changed for a long sleeve shirt, sometimes a bowtie or a lace is worn too. The shoes for both girls and boys are black lace-up shoes (sometimes the shoes may be dark blue, black or wine-coloured, depending on the uniform colours). The sports uniform includes sweatpants, a collared T-shirt, and white sports shoes. The designs and the colours of the uniforms depend on the school's colours and the principal's preference.

== Comoros ==
All Comorian schools require uniforms.

== Democratic Republic of the Congo ==
School uniform is compulsory in Congolese schools. Controversially, many schools oblige students' parents to buy uniforms directly from the institutions.

== Republic of the Congo ==
In October 2016, the Ministry of Education instituted a standardised uniform in all public and private schools across the Republic of the Congo.

== Cook Islands ==
Owing to its British colonial heritage, schools in the Cook Islands require uniforms.

== Costa Rica ==
School uniform is mandatory in Costa Rica from pre-school through secondary school.

== Croatia ==
In Croatian schools, children generally do not wear uniforms. Their use is confined to independent schools, such as those operated by the parent-run Rino Institut.

== Cuba ==
School uniforms are mandatory in Cuba.

== Curaçao ==
School uniforms are compulsory in Curaçaoan public schools.

== Cyprus ==
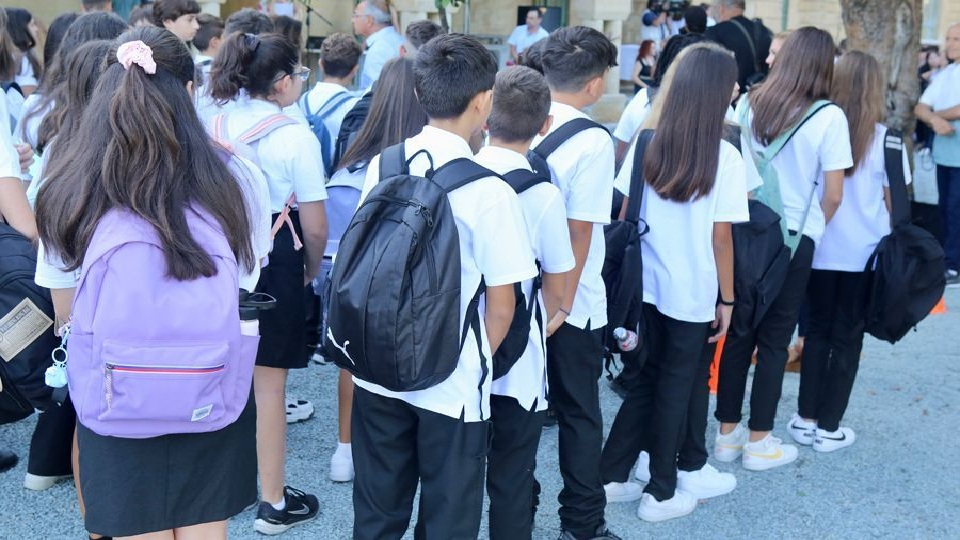
Casual everyday uniform in Cyprus public schools

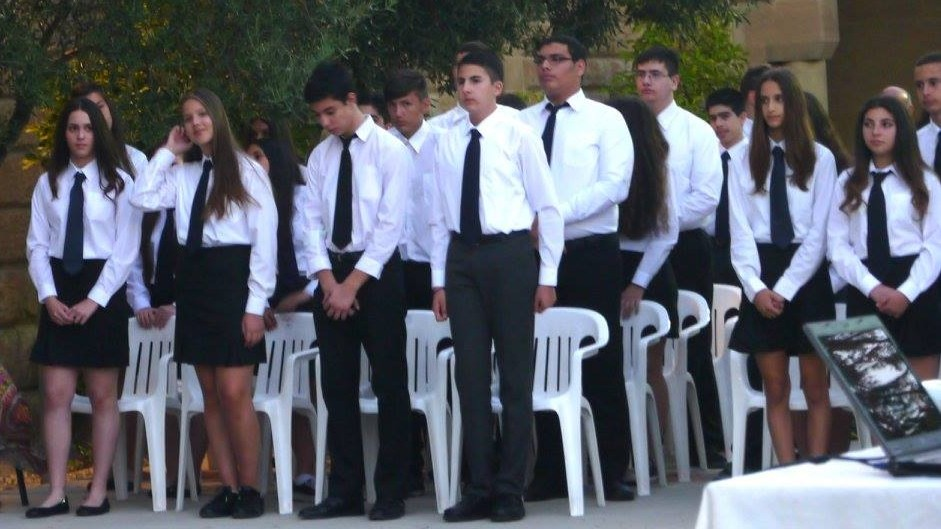
Formal Cyprus public School uniform

Uniforms are compulsory in Cypriot schools. In Cyprus, due to its British colonial past, both public and private schools require students to wear a school uniform. In public primary and secondary schools, the standard uniform consists of a white shirt paired with dark-blue trousers, or a dark-blue skirt for girls. This uniform is worn on a daily basis, while a dark-blue tie is additionally required for special occasions such as celebrations, official events, or school parades.

== Czech Republic ==
School uniforms are not in use in Czech public schools but are in several private schools.

== Denmark ==
Herlufsholm School is the only school in Denmark with a compulsory school uniform.

== Djibouti ==
Uniform is compulsory in Djiboutian schools. In 2020, presidential decree N° 267/2018 imposed a standardised beige uniform in all high schools.

== Dominica ==
Uniform is mandatory in Dominican schools. When the island's schools were closed during the COVID-19 pandemic, education minister Octavia Alfred announced students would be obliged to wear their uniforms while participating in online classes.

== Dominican Republic ==
School uniform is mandatory in Dominican public schools. All students wear khaki pants, regardless of sex or gender identity. Students nationwide wore blue shirts until 2017 when the Ministry of Education introduced a colour-coded system of polo shirts based upon a school's geographical location:

- Central Cibao: burgundy
- Northern Cibao: golden yellow
- South Region: turquoise blue
- East Region: green
- Greater Santo Domingo: royal blue

The new shirts were issued free to students at a reported cost of RD$639,576,485.00.

== East Timor ==
School uniforms were compulsory during the Indonesian occupation of East Timor. Following independence, the use of uniforms persisted.

== Ecuador ==
School uniforms are mandatory in Ecuadorian public schools. In April 2018, the Ministry of Education ruled skirts cannot be made compulsory for female students.

== Egypt ==
In the late 20th century, Egyptian schoolgirls predominantly wore an "apron" (Arabic: المريلة almarilati) — a type of smock — while their male peers wore shirts and pants. More recently, unisex polo shirts and pants have grown in popularity.

== El Salvador ==
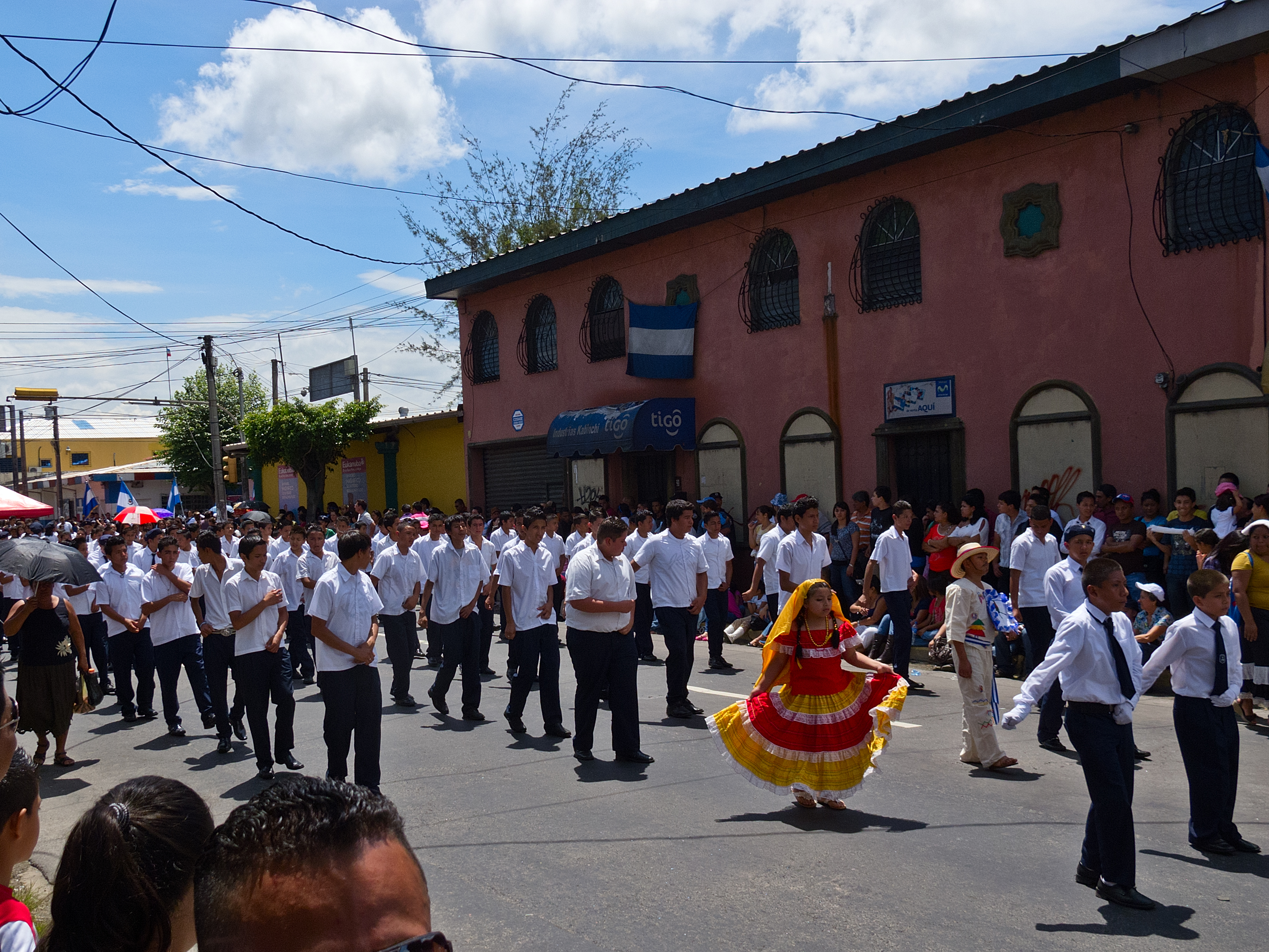
Salvadoran school students celebrating independence day

In El Salvador, all students from public schools and private schools are required to wear uniforms.

== Equatorial Guinea ==
Uniforms are mandatory in Equatoguinean schools.

== Eritrea ==
School uniforms are mandatory in Eritrea.

== Estonia ==
In the Estonian Soviet Socialist Republic, mandatory school uniforms were introduced in the late 1950s. Uniforms were initially abandoned at the end of the 1980s but had already come back into use in some schools by the mid-1990s. This trend continued into the 2010s.

== Eswatini ==
School uniforms are compulsory in all Emaswati schools.

In July 2000, Senator Majahenkhaba Dlamini instructed the education minister to issue a directive compelling schoolgirls aged eleven and older to wear knee-length uniform skirts, ostensibly to fight the spread of HIV/AIDS.

== Ethiopia ==
Uniforms are compulsory in Ethiopian schools.

== Fiji ==
Uniform is compulsory in Fijian public schools. In January 2022, the Ministry of Education, Heritage and Arts relaxed this rule for the first three months of the academic year.

== Finland ==
In the mid-20th century, the former Hallituskatu Girls' School enforced a compulsory school uniform.

As of 2022, the Board of Education maintains it would be illegal to impose a mandatory uniform policy in a Finnish public school.

== France ==
School uniforms have not been compulsory in state schools in France since 1967.

Uniforms have not been enforced in French schools, a few exceptions (such as Maison d'éducation de la Légion d'honneur, les Écoles TUNON, and Vatel). Xavier Darcos, a former teacher and Minister of Education from 2007 to 2009, is an advocate of the reintroduction of uniforms: "This is not outrageous. This removes the visible differences in social status or wealth. This is an additional factor of integration".

The wearing of any religious symbols, such as a hijab or turban, has been banned in French schools since 2004.

Since March 2012, the students of the Boarding School of Excellence Sourdun wear a uniform with the insignia of their establishment.

Les lycées de la défense, formerly known as military schools, require their students to wear uniforms.

In 2024, the French government made some moves to bring back school uniforms by running tests in a few cities.

=== French Guiana ===
French Guianan schools enforce a standardised uniform of coloured T-shirts and blue pants.

=== French Polynesia ===
In 2012, French Polynesia's Minister of Education Tauhiti Nena ordered the overseas collectivity's public schools to adopt mandatory uniform policies. The following October, the Court of Administrative Law annulled the order, by which stage 24 schools had adopted uniform policies. As of August 2015, 13 schools retained these policies.

=== Guadeloupe ===
Use of uniforms and dress codes have become widespread in Guadeloupean schools.

=== Martinique ===
As of 2014, a third of the 345 schools on the French overseas department Martinique impose a non-compulsory uniform policy.

=== New Caledonia ===
In 2017, uniform polo shirts were made compulsory for students attending all 96 primary schools in New Caledonia's South Province.

=== Réunion ===
As of 2012, Collège Sainte-Geneviève in Saint-André is the only Réunionese school to operate a uniform policy: students are obliged to wear logoed white T-shirts.

=== Saint Barthélemy ===
Collège Mireille-Choisy, Saint Barthélemy's only public secondary school, enforces a dress code requiring students to wear a logoed T-shirt and prohibiting certain types of legwear and footwear.

=== Saint Martin ===
Uniforms are worn in Saint-Martinois schools.

== Gabon ==
School uniforms are widely worn in Gabon. A ban on Gabonese schools compelling students to buy uniforms directly from the institutions has led to some students making their own uniforms.

== The Gambia ==
School uniforms are mandatory in The Gambia.

== Germany ==
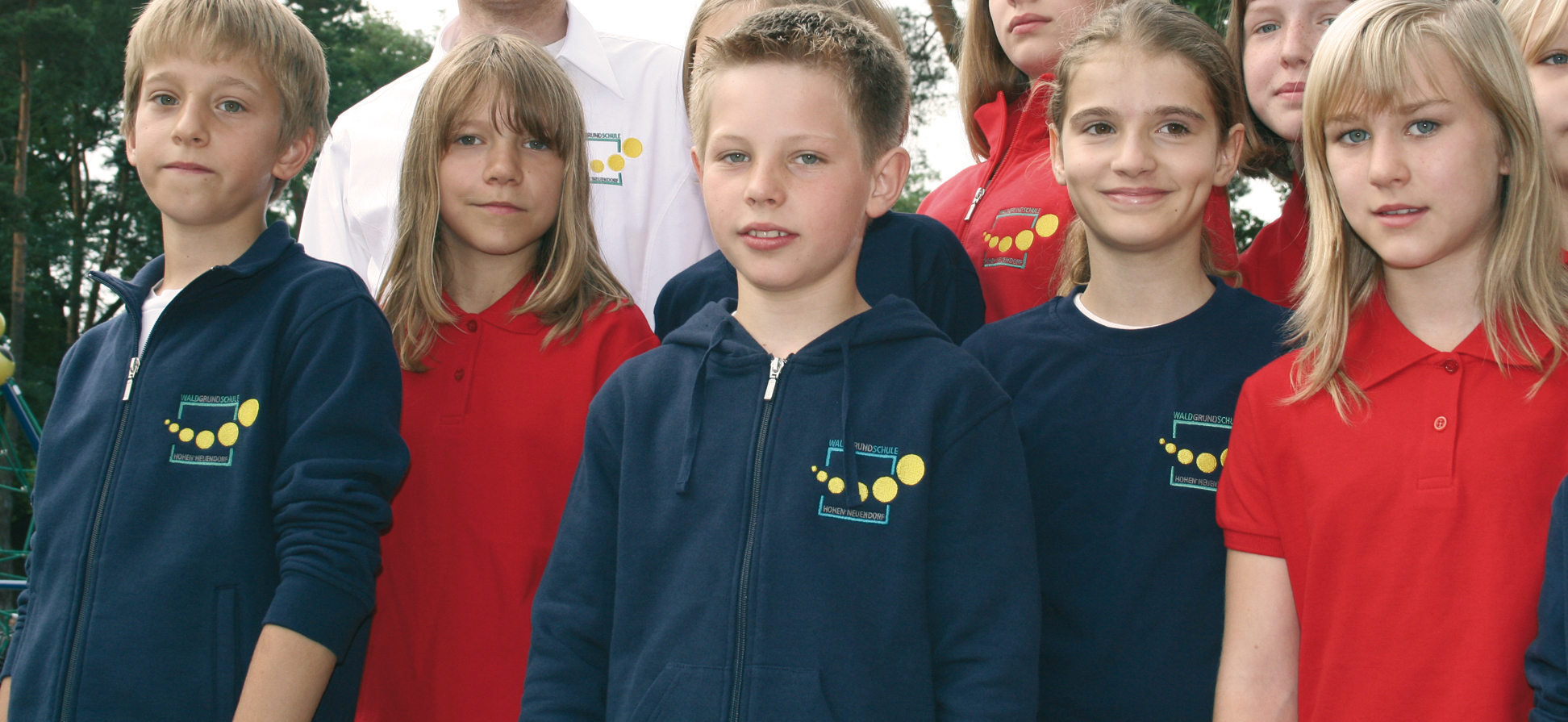
German school children wearing voluntary "Schulkleidung" (2009).

There is no tradition of wearing school uniforms in Germany, and today, almost all students of state schools, private schools or universities do not wear school uniforms. However, certain garments have been common to students in former times:

From the 16th century, students (especially of secondary or grammar schools and similar institutions) were often subject to regulations that prescribed, for example, modest and not too stylish attire. In many cases these regulations were part of wider laws concerning the clothing of all citizens of certain social classes.

A blue coat became a widespread obligatory status symbol of students of secondary schools; it fell out of use during the latter half of the 18th century. In more recent times, school uniforms in any real sense did not exist outside of convent schools and private boarding schools. At times, certain fashions became so widespread that they approached uniform status; this is true in particular for so-called student hats (Schülermützen) that became widespread from the 1880s on and remained somewhat popular until they were banned by the Nazis. Their wearing was advocated by teachers and the students themselves and occasionally made mandatory, but never on a national or statewide level. Another instance are the sailor suits that became fashionable around the turn of the 19th century. These, too, were not usually a prescribed uniform.

The Nazis banned student hats – the last remaining, if voluntary, form of unified student clothing – because they considered them an attribute of class society. They did, however, institute mandatory membership in the uniformed Hitler Youth (HJ) from 1936 until their fall. HJ uniforms were worn in the HJ training academies and in the Napolas; students of other schools sometimes wore them to school at their own discretion.

In recent times, the introduction of school uniforms has been discussed, but usually the expression "uniform" (the word is the same in German) is avoided in favor of terms like "school clothing" ("Schulkleidung"). School clothing has been introduced in a small number of schools, for example in Hamburg-Sinstorf in 2000, and in Friesenheim and Haag (Oberbayern) in 2005. In these cases the clothes are collections of shirts, sweaters, and the like, catering to contemporary fashion senses. Uniforms in a more traditional sense are almost never proposed in earnest.

The debate on mandatory school uniforms intensified in Germany when two Muslim girls dressed in burkas arrived at a school in Bonn in 2006. The girls' actions were interpreted as political action and they were subsequently suspended from school. Then-Justice Minister Brigitte Zypries in an interview with the Welt am Sonntag stated that the simple solution to the issue under consideration is mandatory introduction of school uniforms for boys and girls across Germany. She further argued that school uniforms would help to prevent conflicts arising from religious or political differences. Her stance was supported by then-Minister Of Education Annette Schavan. The proposal was met with opposition from the teacher union and opposition political parties. The teacher union argued that school uniforms are not the solution for integration problems nor the issue of fashion obsession. The leader of the teacher union Heinz-Peter Meidinger also added that the school uniforms have been a controversial issue in Germany over the years.

=== Opposition to school uniforms ===
A senior member of the Green Party, Krista Sager, also said that the introduction of school uniforms would be unacceptable state interference in religious matters. She then proposed that individual schools have to find their own solutions and rejected solutions imposed by government. She further noted that school uniforms are no longer up to date and their imposition would be rejected by the current generation of students. The Conference of Education Ministers, a body that decides on school policies, also kicked back against school uniforms. They cited historical reasons dating back to WWII with memories of Hitler Youth's uniform still fresh in people's minds. They also concluded that the imposition of school uniforms would be excessive government encroachment on personal liberty of pupils and parents. However, a number of schools sell branded clothing that can be worn as a sign of school pride.

The Bildungsstreik movement fights against school uniforms due to their belief that it represents some kind of militarism.

== Ghana ==
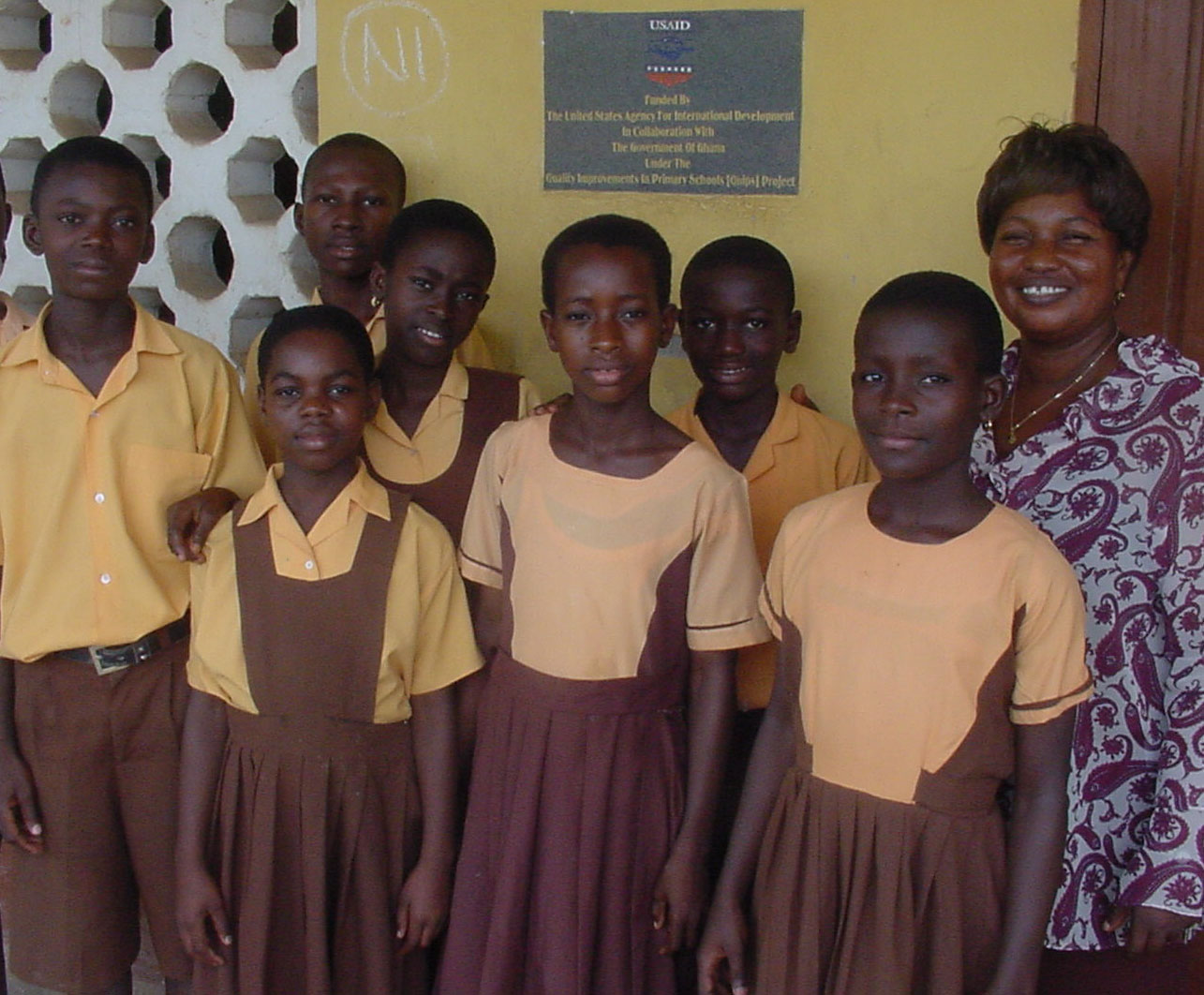
Students of a public school in Ghana wearing their uniform

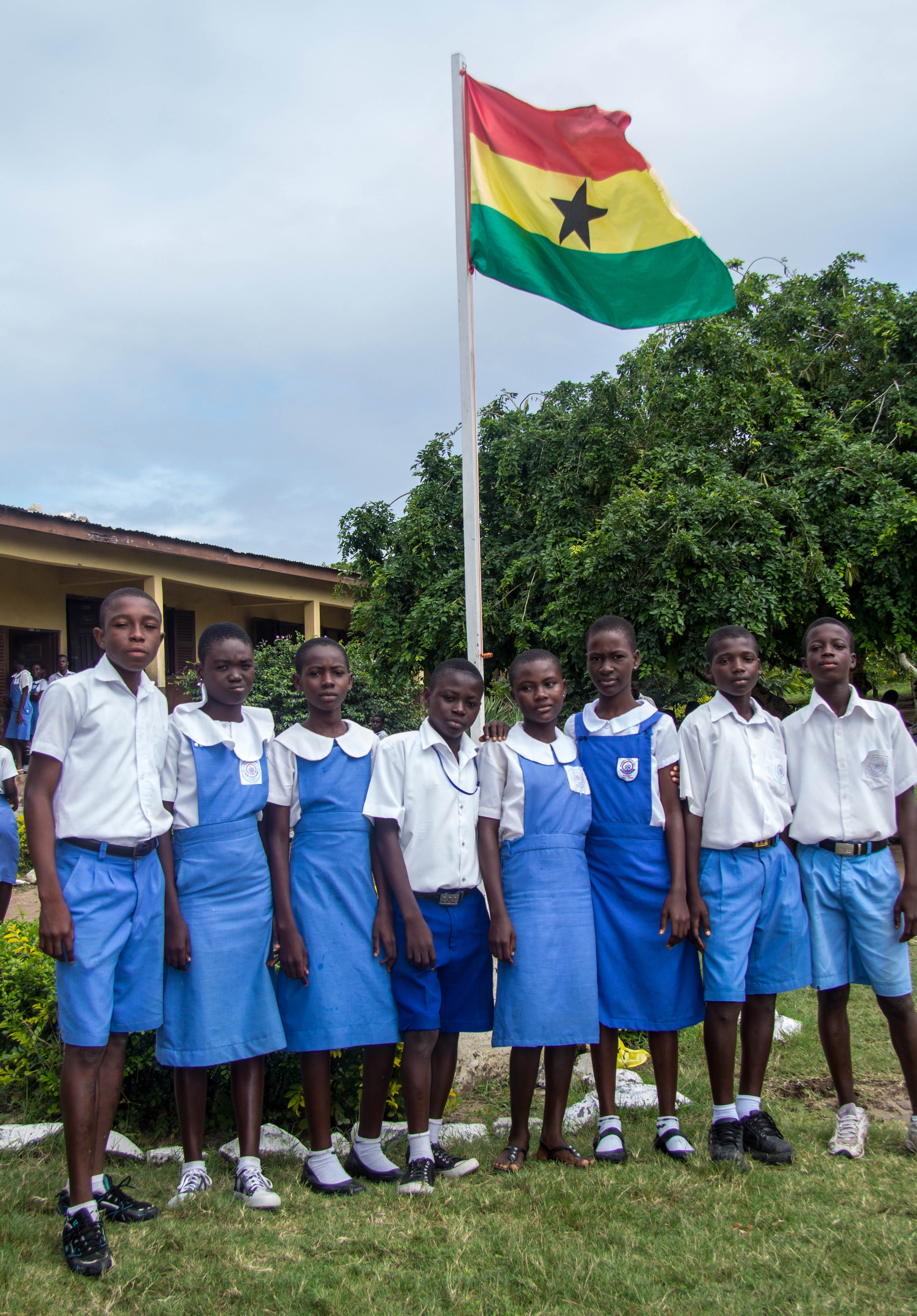
School uniform of a private school in Ghana

All children have to wear school uniforms in Ghana. Pupils in public schools have the same type of school uniform with the school's emblem imprinted on the left chest. This helps to distinguish pupils of one school from the other. Private schools determine which uniforms their pupils wear. On 11 April 2019, the Director-General of the Ghana Education Service, Prof Kwasi Opoku Amankwa announced at a press conference in Accra that public Junior High School pupils will start wearing a new uniform beginning from the 2019–2020 academic year. The new uniform is primarily to distinguish the Junior High pupils from their peers at the primary level. The current brown and yellow khaki school uniform, locally referred to as Konkonte and nkate nkwan (groundnut soup) and worn by pupils at the basic level in public schools, was introduced over 30 years ago by the government.

== Georgia ==
In the Georgian Soviet Socialist Republic, the use of school uniforms was widespread until the 1980s, when they largely disappeared from Georgian schools.

== Greece ==
Uniforms ceased to be worn in Greek public schools in 1982. Their use is now confined to certain private and international schools.

== Grenada ==
Uniforms are worn in all Grenadian public schools. The Grenadian government runs an annual School Uniform Voucher Programme to help students' families meet the associated costs.

== Guatemala ==
School uniforms are widely worn in Guatemalan schools. However, in 2008, Álvaro Colom prohibited the enforcement of mandatory uniforms in public schools.

== Guinea ==
School uniforms are worn in Guinean public schools.

== Guinea-Bissau ==
In October 2020, it was announced a standardized uniform would be introduced across all Bissau-Guinean public and private schools.

== Guyana ==
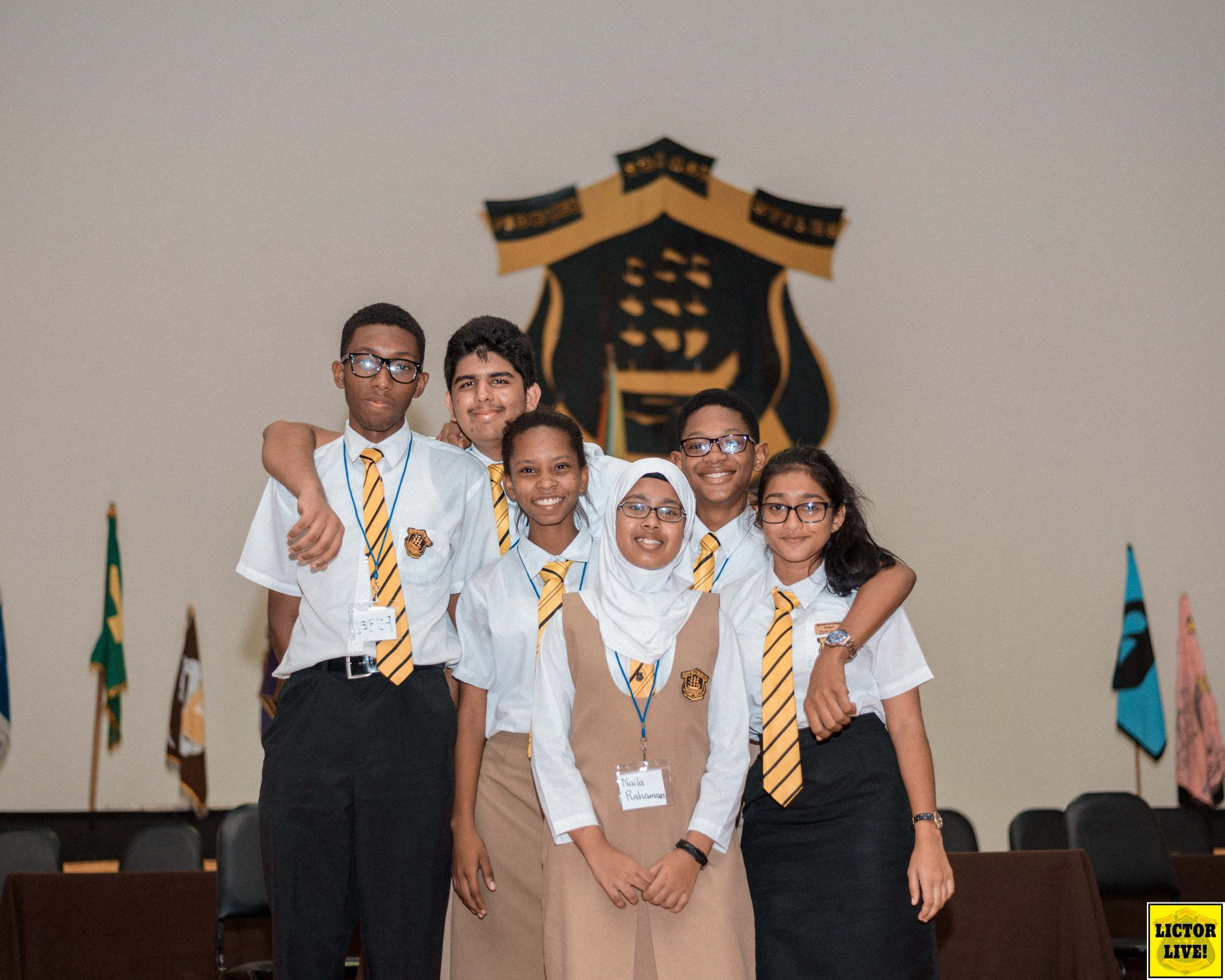
Students of Queen's College showing the lower and upper school uniform in Guyana

Guyana has a long history of school uniforms being compulsory. Students attending public and private schools up to the secondary level are required to wear them. In some instances, this extends to those attending classes on Saturdays and during periods when schools are officially closed. The Guyanese government dispenses grants to assist students with uniform costs.

== Haiti ==
School uniforms are compulsory in Haitian schools.

== Honduras ==
On 18 March 2014, the National Congress of Honduras approved a decree introducing a single uniform of white shirts and blue pants or skirts in all Honduran public schools.

== Hungary ==
School uniforms are not currently worn in Hungarian public schools.

In the Hungarian People's Republic, the "school coat" (Hungarian: iskolaköpeny) was made compulsory for all schoolchildren in September 1973.

== Iceland ==
School uniforms are rare in Icelandic schools, though some primary schools have taken steps towards adopting dress codes.

== India ==
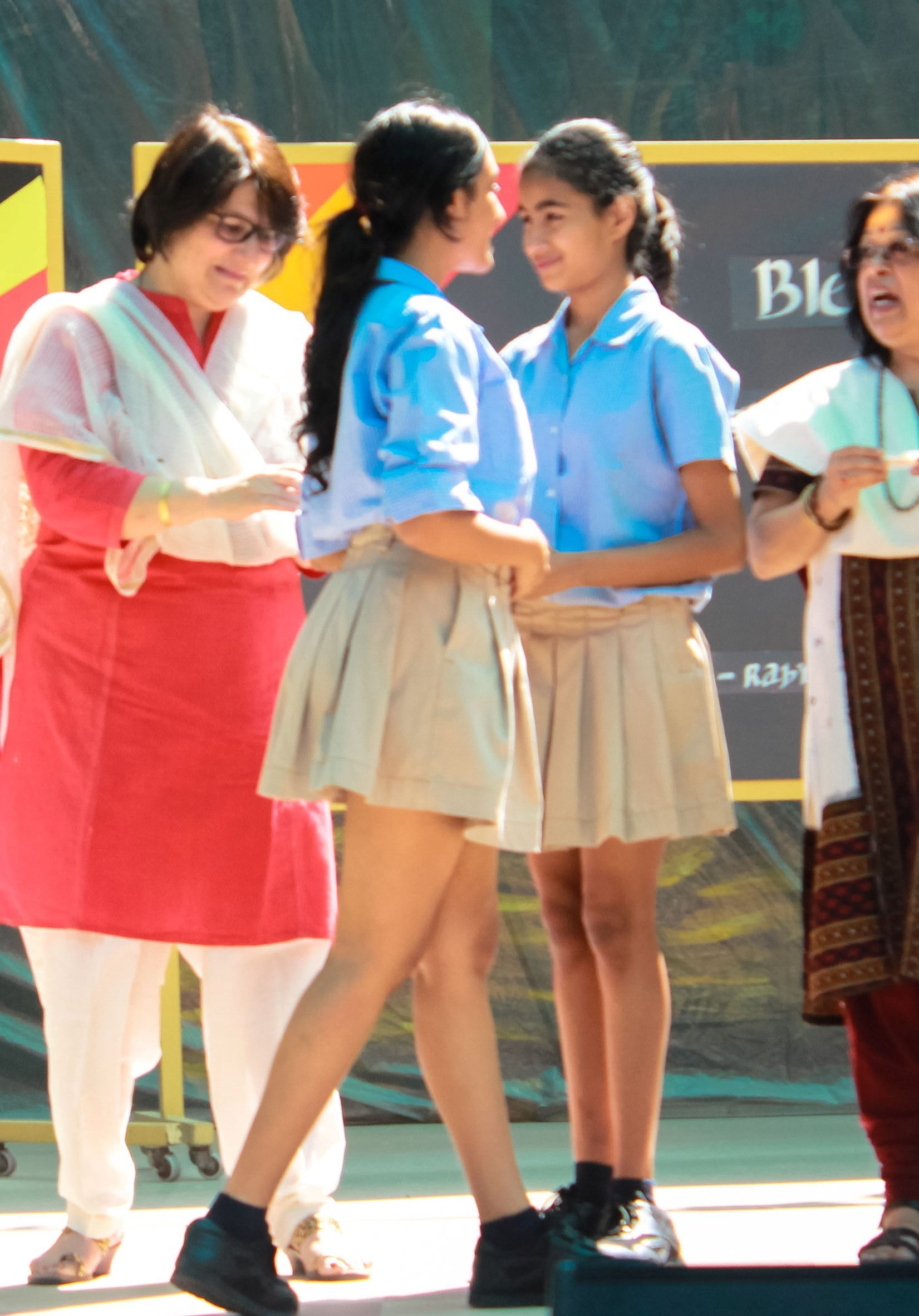
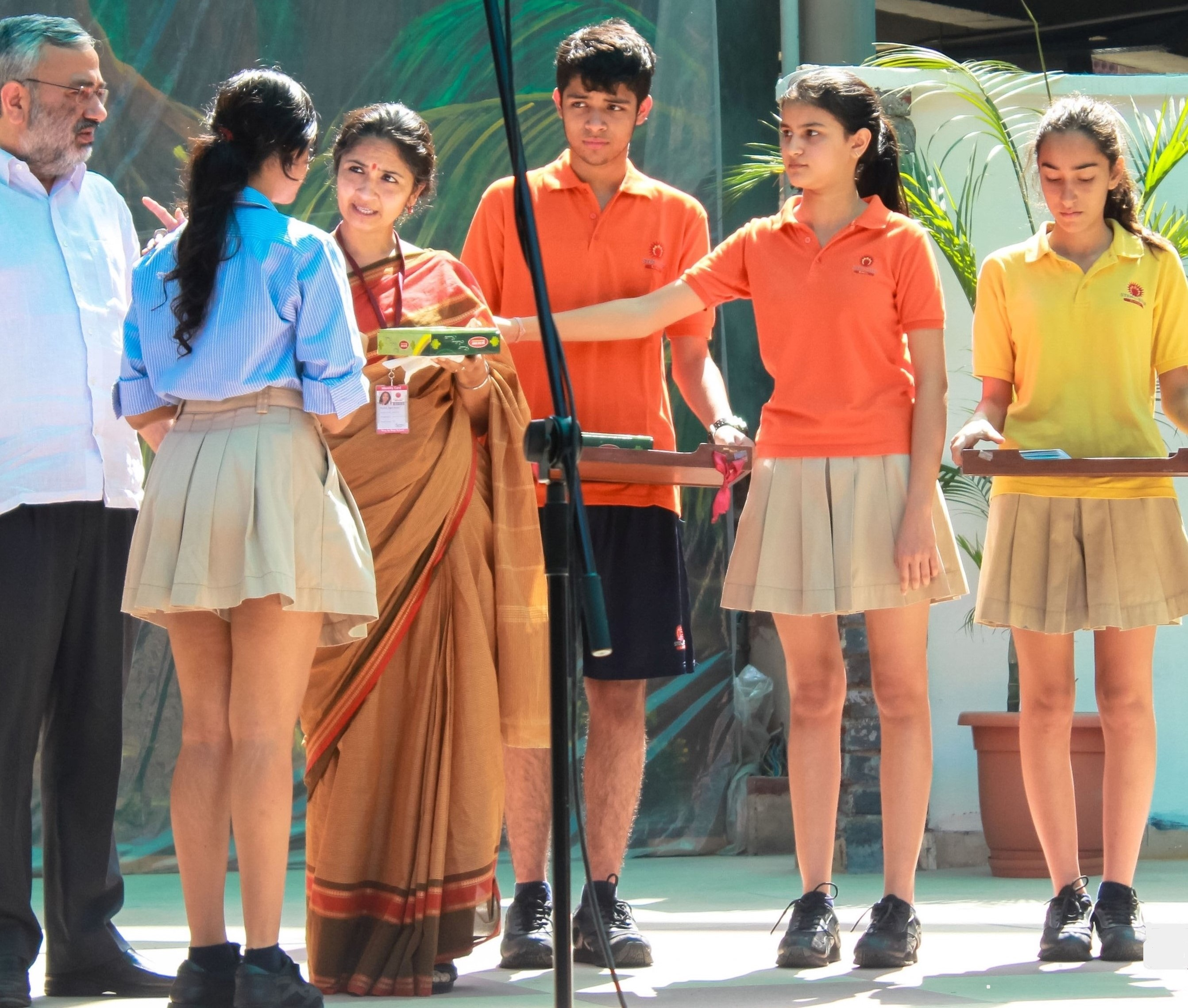
Indian school students in their summer uniform

Uniforms are compulsory in India in both public and private schools. The boys' uniforms are often made of a light-coloured shirt, long trousers usually blue, white or black, and those of the girls are often a shirt and a skirt. Most schools employ this form of uniform however Shalwar Kameez is prescribed in some of the rural north Indian areas but rarely seen in urban areas.

Many schools require students to wear uniform shoes, ties and ID cards, and comb their hair down and keep it clean and short. Long hair is tied in braids. Uniform is one of the most important components of school life and is taken very seriously in India. Many government-run schools across different states also provide free uniforms and school bags to the students.

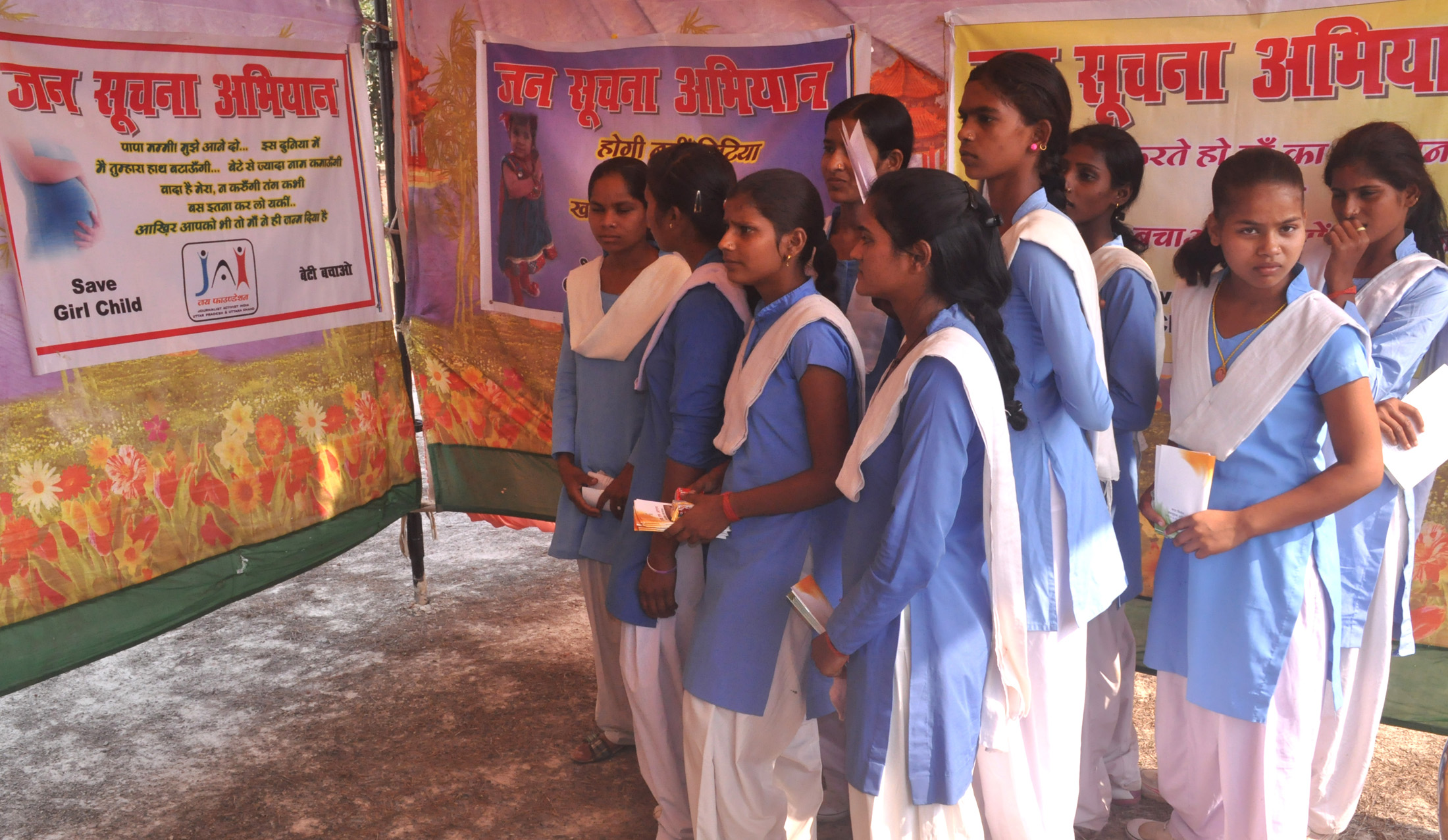
School girls in India in Shalwar kameez uniforms

Some institutions also require the use of a tie, especially the schools run by private institutions, and the Indian education system does not prohibit the children on the ground of religion. There is no discrimination on the basis of religion in the field of education in India. That's why all the children are allowed to wear the same uniform, no matter what religion you belong to. However, most of the schools, whether public or private, prohibit students to have dyed hair or males to have a ponytail.

== Indonesia ==
In Indonesia, national school uniforms are mandatory for every student during Monday to Thursday. They can be simply described as below for each stage of education:

- Elementary schools or Sekolah Dasar (SD) students wear a white short-sleeve shirt with red shorts for male students, and below-knee skirts for females.
- Junior high schools or Sekolah Menengah Pertama (SMP) require navy blue shorts or trousers with a short-sleeve white shirt for male students. Females wear a below-knee-length or long navy blue skirt and short-sleeve white shirt.
- Senior high schools or Sekolah Menengah Atas (SMA) require blue-grey trousers with a short-sleeve white shirt. Females wear a below-knee-length or long blue-grey skirt, and wear short-sleeve or long-sleeve white shirts.

Public schools in Indonesia tolerate religious freedoms. For example, Muslim girls may opt to wear long-sleeve shirts, longer skirts, and jilbab to cover their heads. Some schools in Indonesia also have a batik uniform, usually worn on Friday or Saturday. This kind of uniform consists of a batik short-sleeve or long-sleeve shirt, with long or short trousers for SMA and below-knee or long skirts for females. The motifs and colours of batik depend on the school. Some schools tend to issue ties and/or vests for their students. These ties and vests may vary from school to school in colour and sewing pattern, even among public schools.

Nowadays, with the increase of private schools in Indonesia, most private schools have their own signature school uniform. Most consist of shirts with shorts or trousers for males, and skirts for females, only with differences on the colour.

Every school has its own standard grooming. Male students are not allowed to have long hair. Accessories are also normally prohibited for males, except for watches. Females are usually allowed to use simple accessories such as watches, earrings, and sometimes bracelets. Wearing nail polish is usually not allowed.

Most schools pay attention to the shoes that can be worn. Black or white sneakers with white laces are the most common shoes. Few higher-level students, such as in SMA or SMK, are normally required to wear black leather shoes.

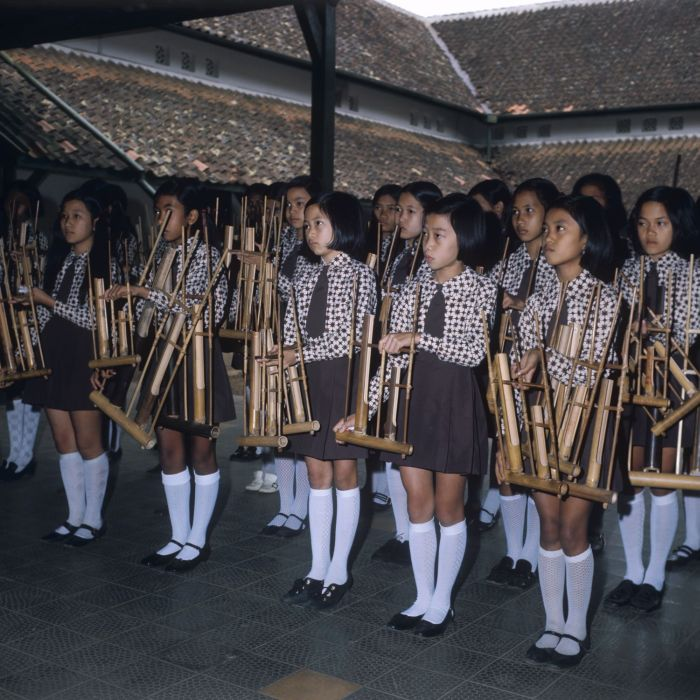
Schoolgirls in Indonesia in 1971

The school badge is usually put on the right sleeve of a shirt, consist of school's name and location, and some have their own school's logo. Others prefer to wear the school's logo as a lapel or breast plastic or metal pin. The emblem of OSIS (Organisasi Siswa Intra Sekolah), or School's Intern Student Organization, is put on the shirt's left pocket. Students' names are usually on the right side of the shirt and embedded by sewing, ironing or as a detachable badge. Some schools (usually "SMP" and "SMA") distinguish the grade of their students by stripes on the official ties issued or an emblem below the school emblem (it can be stripes, chevrons or numbers).

Since school year 2014/2015, elementary and middle schools are require the students to wear an Indonesian flag school badge sewn on top of their left pocket.

The scouts (pramuka) uniform is used in many schools in Indonesia at least once a week. It consists of light-brown short-sleeve or long-sleeve shirts, with dark-brown shorts or trousers, and below-knee skirts or longer for females. The common day to wear the scout uniform usually falls on Friday or Saturday. Furthermore, on certain occasions (usually on ceremonies or competitions), the uniform should be worn as full dress, with red and white scarf/tie, dark brown beret, rope, dagger and scout's stick.

The scout uniform has two breast pockets. Above right pocket is the student's name. The Gerakan Pramuka Indonesia (Indonesian Scout Movement) logo is sewn on the left pocket (for male students). On the right sleeve there are scouting organization's location, number and logo, while on the left sleeve usually are the student's scouting team logo and chevrons denoting his/her grade. Male students wear International Scout Organization logo above their name and female students on their lapel.

== Ireland ==
In Ireland, almost all primary and secondary schools require students to wear a uniform. These can vary from school to school but for the most part include trousers for male students, a skirt or pinafore for female students and a shirt, a jumper and a tie. In recent years many schools also offer the option of trousers for female students. Some schools require blazers rather than jumpers. Some primary schools now let their pupils wear a school tracksuit rather than a formal uniform. Primary and Secondary schools under the patronage of Educate Together, have no school uniforms in their network of over 100 schools.

In recent years there has been criticism, including by the Department of Education of the requirement that a school uniform jumper must have the school crest or name imprinted onto it and of the practice where a school's uniform can only be bought from a certain supplier, which can markedly increase the price of a uniform. As well as rules regarding the wearing of a uniform, many schools have regulations regarding hair, footwear, the growth of facial hair for males, the wearing of makeup and the length of school skirts.

== Israel ==
According to former Education Minister Limor Livnat, about 1,400 Israeli public schools require pupils to wear uniforms.

School uniforms used to be the norm in the state's early days, but have since fallen out of favor. However, in recent years, the number of schools using school uniforms has been increasing once more. Many teachers, parents and students are in favor of returning the school uniform to common use to prevent the deepening of the gap between affluent children and those less well-off. Nowadays school uniforms are mainly associated with "national religious" schools within the Israeli system of education. Schools for Arab citizens of Israel also frequently require uniforms: for girls, it is often a pinafore to be worn over trousers and shirt.

In the Haredi or strictly Orthodox school system, uniforms are compulsory in essentially all girls' schools. In the vast majority of these, the style adopted by the Beit Ya'akov network is used: a sky-blue, button-down, open-collar, loose-fitting blouse with an Oxford-blue, pleated skirt that comes to just below the knee and dark stockings. In cold weather, a Yale-blue sweater may be added. A small fraction of schools alter the colour scheme to pink and burgundy, while otherwise retaining the same overall appearance. In boys' schools there is usually not an identifiable school uniform, distinct from what is considered acceptable for ordinary street wear. However, the standards of acceptable street wear for boys and men in Haredi communities are so precise and exacting that in almost all cases all of the boys in a particular school will be dressed identically.

In non-Haredi schools today, school uniforms in Israel consist only of a shirt with the school logo. In the summer, the uniform shirt is a simple T-shirt, while in the winter, the shirts worn are warm or hooded sweaters. Although the shirts are uniform, they usually come in various colours, and allow students to customize and express themselves even while wearing a uniform. The shirts sell for a very small amount of money, so that even the less well-off can acquire them.

== Italy ==
In Italy, school uniforms are uncommon, partially because child uniforms are associated with the era of Benito Mussolini before World War II when children were placed according to their age into Italian Fascist youth movements and had to wear uniforms inside and outside school.

However, until the early 1960s many high schools required girls to wear black grembiule (resembling a doctor smock) on top of their clothes: no uniform was required for boys.

Nowadays, many pre-schools advise parents to dress their children with a grembiulino, i.e., a small grembiule, usually shorter and more colourful, that can be purchased cheaply.

Some elementary schools advise some kind of grembiule for the younger pupils. Sometimes girls are required to wear a pink or white grembiulino, while boys may be required to wear a short cotton jacket, usually blue or black. In other cases both boys and girls may be required to wear a more neutral blue grembiule.

Some parents send their children to school in a grembiule even if the school does not require it.

Poet and children's writer Gianni Rodari has described adult life as "a school without grembiule and school desk".

In 2004 the Italian chapter of WWF warned that synthetic grembiuli were harmful to pupils.

In July 2008 Education Minister Mariastella Gelmini proposed the re-introduction of the compulsory smock in public schools, provoking a debate in the Italian press.

In 2014, with the association of IT-PAN, the grembiuli wasn't needed after

== Iran ==
Iranian schools generally employ uniform policies but students cannot legally be compelled to wear them.

== Iraq ==
School uniforms are worn in Iraqi public schools.

== Ivory Coast ==
In October 2003, the Ivorian government abolished the compulsory wearing of school uniforms in all schools. By 2012, compulsory school uniforms had been re-implemented.

== Jamaica ==
School uniform is compulsory in all Jamaican schools. In public schools, uniform requirements are set by an institution's school board.

== Japan ==
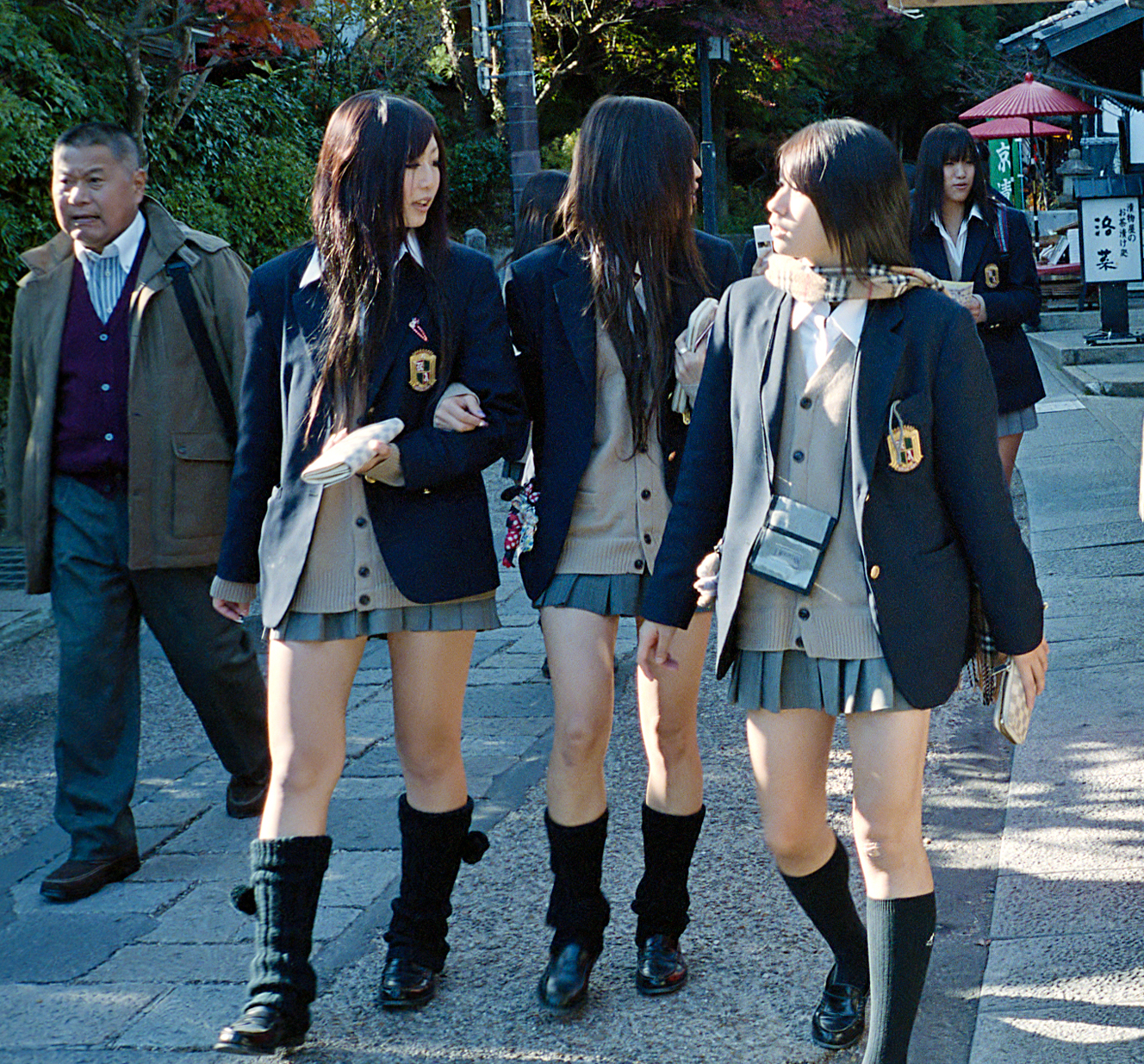
Japanese schoolgirls wearing knee-high loose socks.

Japan introduced school uniforms in the late 19th century. Today, school uniforms are almost universal in the public and private school systems. They are also used in some women's colleges. The Japanese word for uniform is seifuku (制服).

In the majority of elementary schools, students are not required to wear a uniform to school. Where they are required, many boys wear white shirts, short trousers, and caps. Young boys often dress more formally in their class pictures than they do other days of the school year. Girls' uniforms might include a grey pleated skirt and white blouse. Occasionally the sailor outfit is used for girls. The uniform codes may vary by season to work with the environment and occasion. It is common for boys and girls to wear brightly coloured caps to prevent traffic accidents. It is normal for uniforms to be worn outside of school areas. However, this is going out of fashion and many students are wearing casual dress.

The Japanese junior- and senior-high-school uniform traditionally consists of a military style for boys and a sailor outfit for girls. These uniforms are based on Meiji era formal military dress, themselves modeled on European-style naval uniforms. The sailor outfit replace the undivided hakama (andon bakama 行灯袴) designed by Utako Shimoda between 1920 and 1930. While this style is still in use, many schools have moved to more Western-pattern parochial school uniform styles. They consist of a white shirt, tie, blazer or sweater vest with school crest, and tailored trousers (often not of the same colour as the blazer or sweater vest) for boys and a white blouse, tie, blazer with school crest, and tartan skirt for girls.

Much like the male uniform, the gakuran, the sailor outfit bears a similarity to military-styled naval uniforms. The uniform generally consists of a blouse attached with a sailor-style collar and a pleated skirt. There are seasonal variations for summer and winter: sleeve length and fabric are adjusted accordingly. A ribbon is tied in the front and laced through a loop attached to the blouse. Several variations on the ribbon include ties, bolo ties, neckerchiefs, and bows. Common colours are navy blue, white, grey, light green and black.

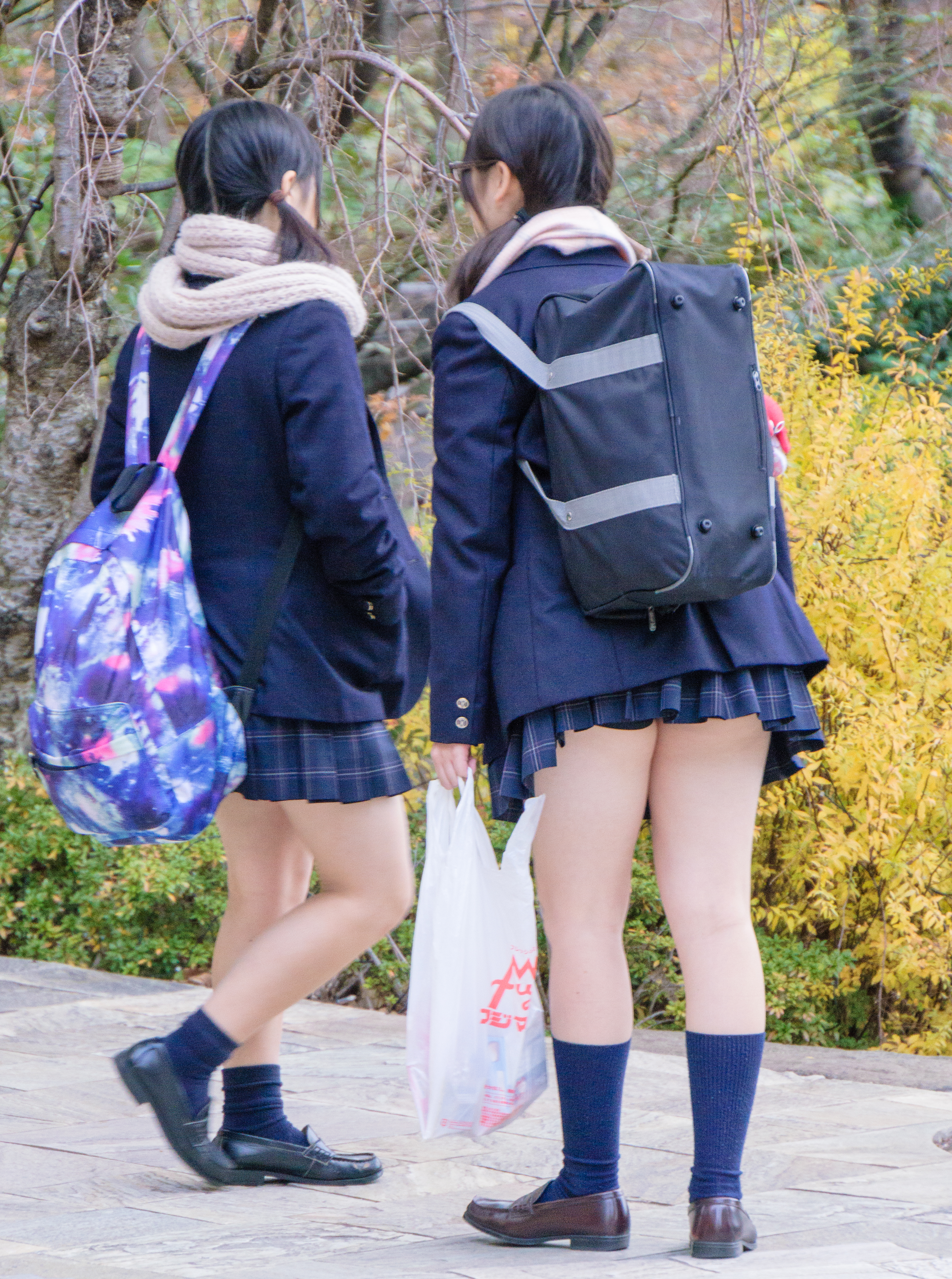
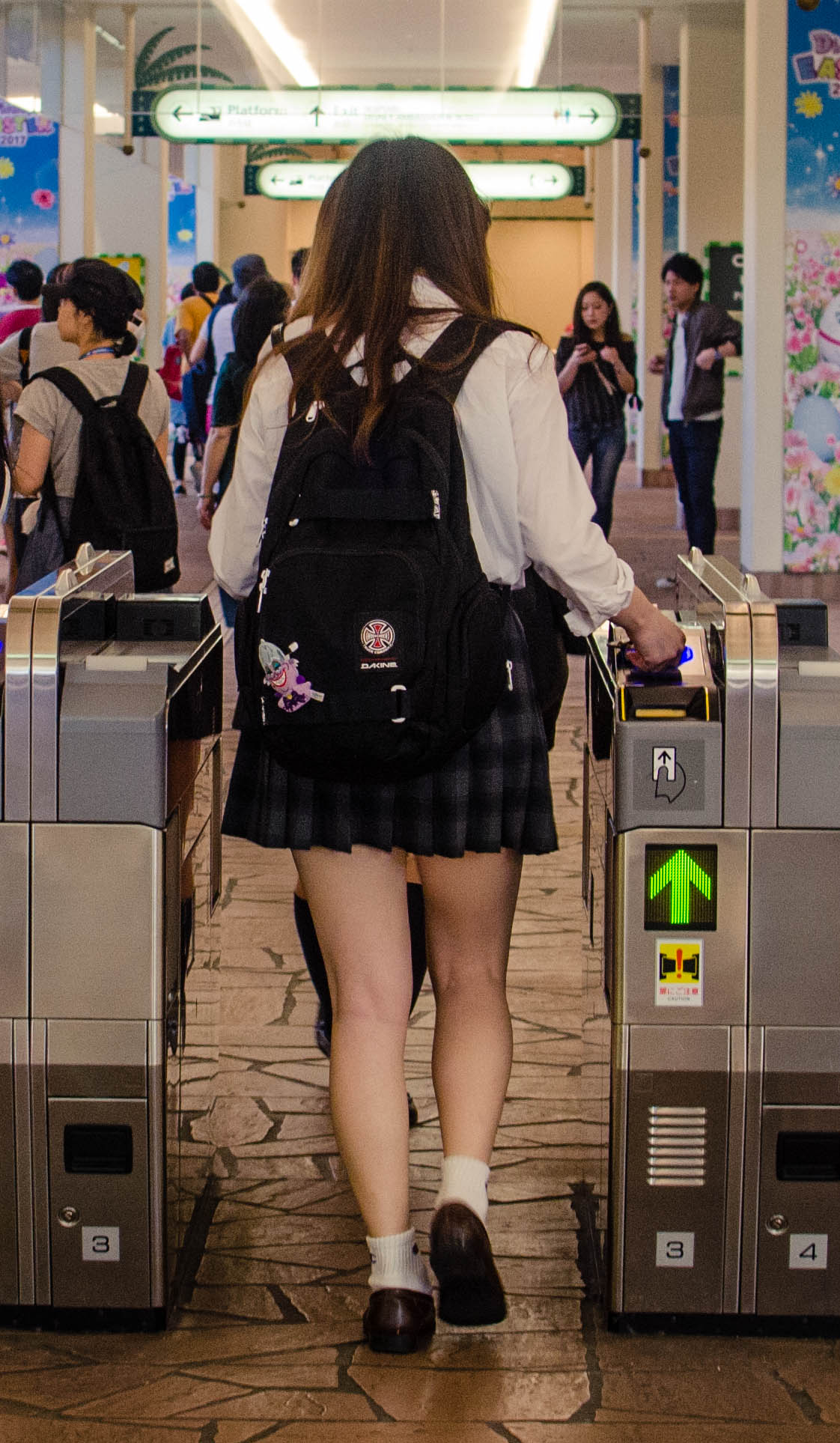
Kogal culture: Miniskirt used as school uniform by Japanese schoolgirls. Left: winter uniform, right: summer uniform.

Shoes, socks, and other accessories are sometimes included as part of the uniform. The socks are typically navy or white. The shoes are typically brown or black penny loafers. Although not part of the prescribed uniform, alternate forms of legwear (such as loose socks, knee-length stockings, or similar) are commonly matched by more fashionable girls with their sailor outfits.

Regardless of what type of uniform any particular school assigns its students, all schools have a summer version (usually consisting of a white dress shirt and dark slacks for boys and a reduced-weight traditional uniform or blouse and tartan skirt with tie for girls) and a sports-activity uniform (a polyester track suit for year-round use and a T-shirt and shorts for summer activities). Depending on the discipline level of their school, students may wear seasonal and activity uniforms in the same classroom during the day. Students may attempt to subvert the system of uniforms by wearing them incorrectly or by adding prohibited elements such as large loose socks or badges.

Miniskirts have been very popular in Japan, where they became part of school uniforms, and they came to be worn within the Kogal culture.

== Jordan ==
Uniforms are compulsory in Jordanian public schools. Male students in elementary and secondary schools wear khaki uniforms. Female elementary students wear blue uniforms and their secondary counterparts wear green ones. Girls are also allowed to wear jilbabs provided they are either grey or dark blue.

== Kazakhstan ==
The first recorded use of school uniform in Kazakhstani schools was in 1918. In the Republic of Kazakhstan, uniforms are worn throughout the public education system. In January 2017, the Ministry of Education announced a ban on the wearing of religious symbols in schools.

== Kenya ==
School uniforms are generally compulsory in Kenyan public primary and secondary schools. A 2018 World Bank study found that Kenyan students receiving subsidized school uniforms reduced absenteeism by 37%.

== Kiribati ==
Uniforms are worn in I-Kiribati schools.

== Kosovo ==
Some Kosovan schools require uniforms. 'Religious uniforms' are officially banned in Kosovan public schools.

== Kuwait ==
Most schools in Kuwait have a uniform.

== Kyrgyzstan ==
In 2015, school uniforms became mandatory in Kyrgyz public schools.

== Laos ==
School uniforms are worn in Laotian schools.

== Latvia ==
On 11 November 1928, a standardised school uniform was introduced across all Latvian schools: for girls, a dark blue dress with a white collar and dark apron; for boys, a dark suit with a high collar. Uniforms continued to be mandatory throughout the Latvian Socialist Soviet Republic era. After largely falling out of use following independence, many schools have readopted uniform policies in the early 21st century.

== Lebanon ==
In Lebanon, most schools adopt school uniforms. They are usually composed of a shirt (usually with a pattern) and/or a polo shirt, a jumper, skirts for girls and trousers for boys.

Some public schools do not require school uniforms.

== Lesotho ==
In Lesotho school uniforms are still compulsory. Many poor families can not afford them, which is one of the reasons for the high dropout rate in primary schools.

== Liberia ==
Uniforms are compulsory in Liberian schools. In October 2021, the Ministry of Education rebuked certain private and faith-based schools for compelling students to purchase uniforms directly from the institutions.

== Libya ==
Uniforms are worn in Libyan schools.

== Liechtenstein ==
School uniforms are not widely worn in Liechtenstein.

In September 2011, a primary school in Triesen adopted a voluntary uniform of logoed polo shirts following a campaign by the local parents' association.

== Luxembourg ==
Luxembourg has no history of school uniforms in its public and private school systems.

== Madagascar ==
Malagasy public and private schools require uniforms.

== Malawi ==
In Malawi, school uniform is widespread but not necessarily compulsory. The UNICEF-backed government scheme Social Cash Transfer Programme frequently subsidizes the cost of uniform.

On 29 June 2021, female members of the National Assembly dressed in primary school-style uniforms to promote girls' education. Minister of Education Agnes Nyalonje was sent out of the chamber for not complying with the dress code.

== Malaysia ==
In Malaysia, school uniforms (Malay: Pakaian Seragam Sekolah) are compulsory for all students who attend public schools. Western-style school uniforms were introduced to present-day Malaysia in the late 19th century during the British colonial era. The present design was standardised beginning in January 1970. Today, school uniforms are almost universal in the public and private school systems.

The uniforms at Malaysian public schools are as follows:

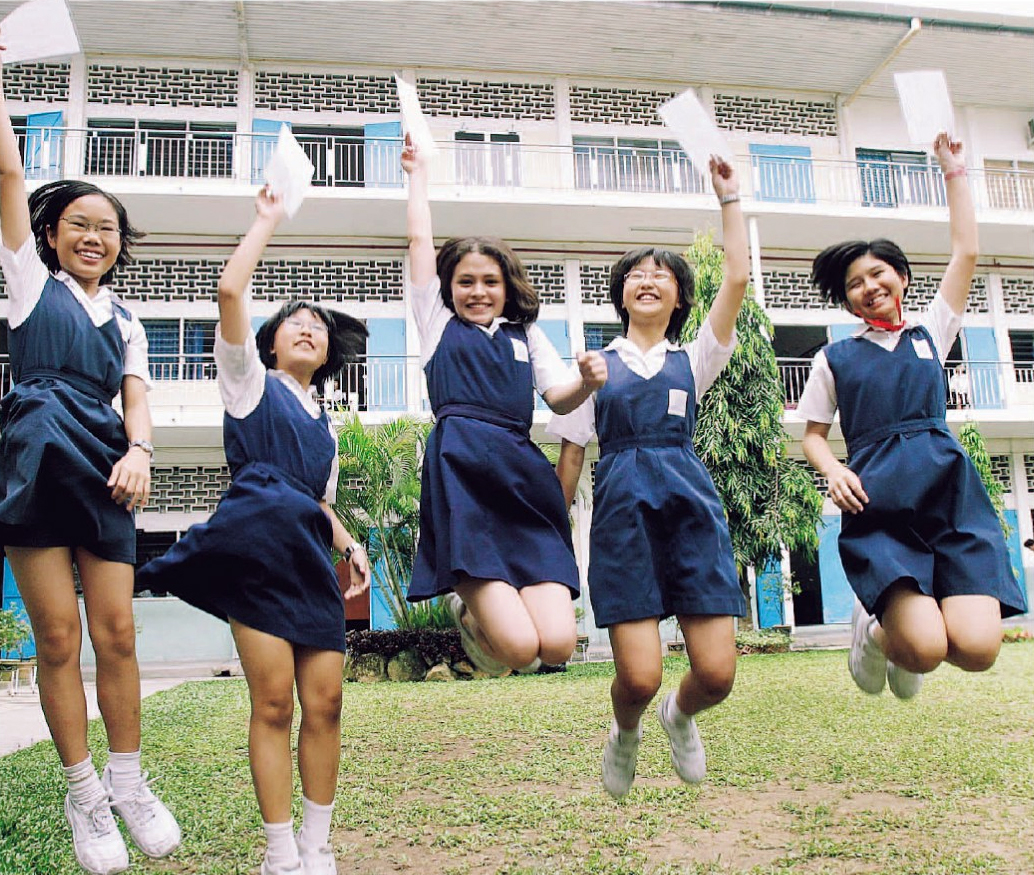
Malaysian school girls in pinafores.

Students are required to wear white socks and white shoes, or black socks and black shoes with the above uniform. For modesty reasons, most schools require female students who wear the baju kurung to wear a plain-coloured camisole underneath.

In addition to these, schools usually have badges that must be sewn or ironed on to the uniform – generally at the left chest. Some schools require students to sew their name tags in addition to the badge. For upper forms, students generally have to wear a school-specific tie, except those who are wearing the baju kurung.

In Malaysia, Muslim girls tend to wear the baju kurung. Most of them start wearing a white tudung (Malaysian version of the Muslim headscarf or hijab) upon entering secondary school, for religious reasons. Non-Muslim girls tend to wear the pinafore. Some non-Muslim girls wear the baju kurung but without the tudung.

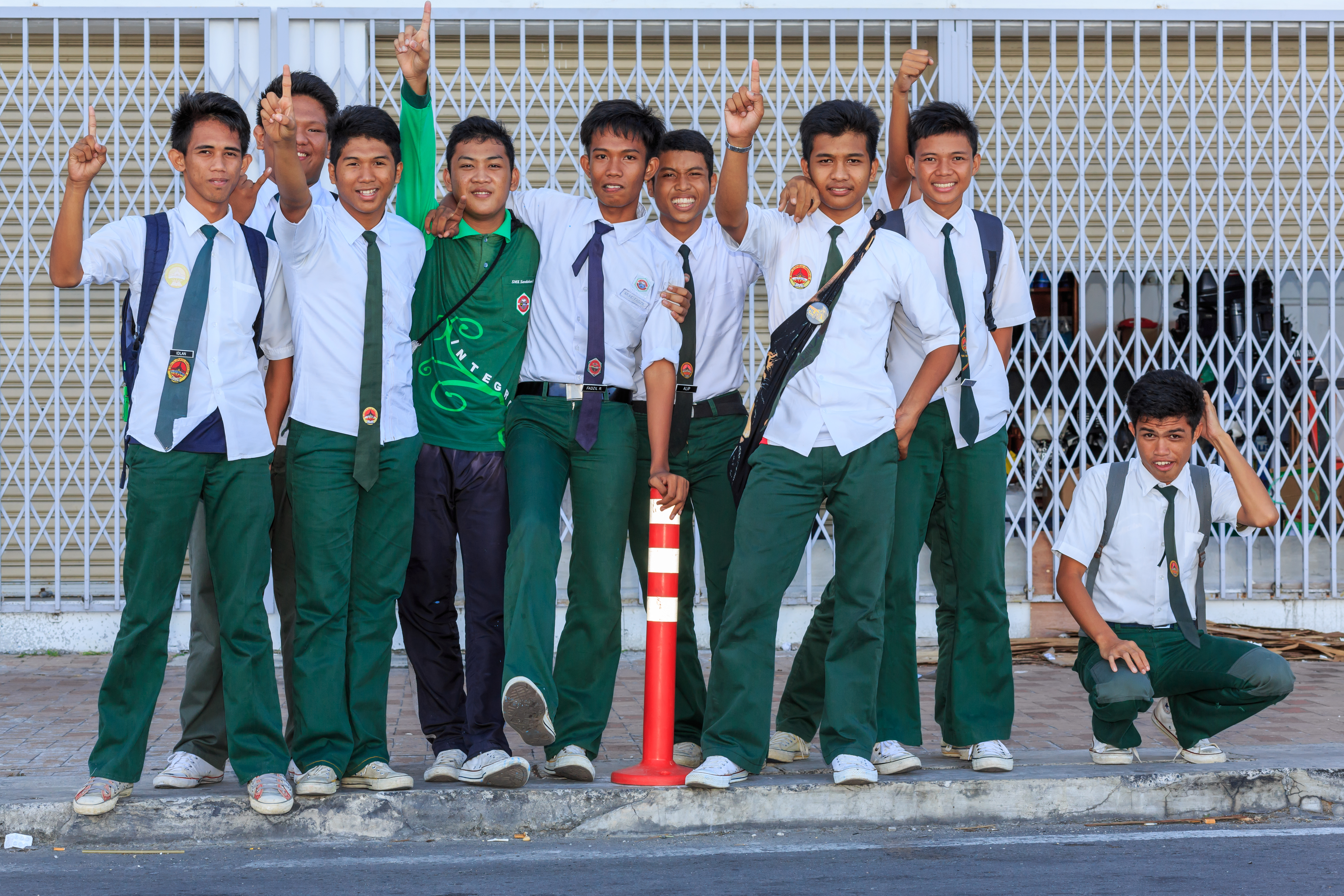
Malaysian secondary school boys uniform.

Muslim boys may wear baju melayu at school on Fridays, often with a songkok hat, to be dressed for going to the mosque for prayers at lunchtime.

Girls who choose to wear the pinafore, especially those attending co-ed schools, usually wear shorts under their pinafore to allow for carefree movement as the skirt only covers up to the knee. Those who wear the baju kurung tend not to wear shorts under their long skirt as their skirt covers their legs.

Students who hold positions in schools such as School Prefects, Librarian and Head Class often wear different uniforms than regular students. Therefore, some schools have prescribed the wearing of Ties for students who have positions in the school and some schools require the wearing of Ties to all students. Some schools have ties as standard issue; even then, the ties are generally reserved for school events and public appearances, and are not part of the everyday school uniform. The tropical climate makes them uncomfortable.

The hairstyle of students is given attention by schools and the Ministry of Education. Schools do not allow students to dye their hair. For boys, there is usually a maximum length allowed, for example, the hair must be a few centimetres above the collar, and no sideburns are allowed. Violation of boys' hair regulations is often punished with a caning; some offer the alternative of an enforced haircut at the school (although the result of the haircut may be deliberately made to be humiliating as part of the punishment). The use of hair gel is prohibited in some of the stricter schools, to prevent excessive hairdressing. Girls' long hair must be properly tied up, often into a ponytail. Some schools dictate the colour and type of hair accessories that can be used. Some prohibit even girls from having long hair. Wearing make up in school is prohibited.

Schools usually enforce their uniform code thoroughly, with regular checks by teachers and prefects. Students who fail to comply may be warned, given demerit points, publicly punished, sent home from school, or caned.

== Maldives ==
School uniforms are widely worn in the Maldives.

== Mali ==
Unlike most African countries, uniforms are not mandatory in Malian public schools. However, they are compulsory in private schools.

== Malta ==
Children in Malta are obliged to wear school uniforms.

== Marshall Islands ==
Marshallese schoolchildren wear uniforms.

== Mauritania ==
In August 2021, education minister Maa El-ainine Ould Eyih announced a compulsory uniform would be imposed in all Mauritanian public schools.

== Mauritius ==
School uniforms in Mauritius are generally compulsory. Mauritius being a former British colony, has been using the system from back then. The students have to wear uniforms from primary school until higher secondary level. However, there are a few private schools that are based on the French system and do not require the student to wear school uniform.

== Mexico ==
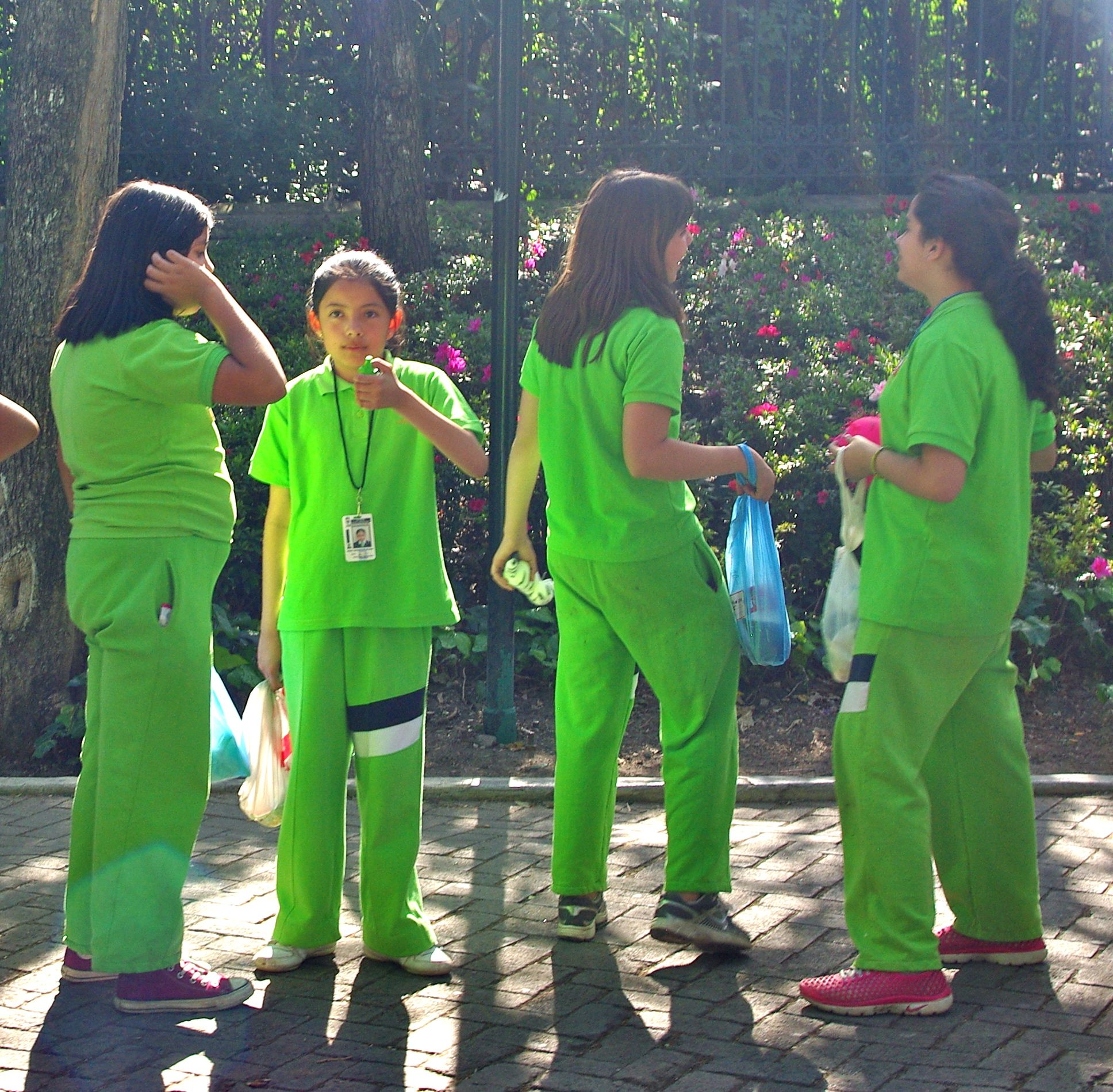
Mexican schoolgirls wearing P.E. uniforms, 2010

In Mexico, students from all public primary and secondary schools, and some public high schools are required to wear uniform.

Most private schools require uniform even since nursery school, however, many private secondary and high schools are opting to eliminate it.

Mexican uniforms have the school's logo and colours. Most Mexican schools have 2 types of uniforms: one for P.E. and another for regular school days. Many public secondary schools have a different regular uniform for each grade, especially for girls.

Uniforms usually consist of the following (but may vary by school):

- Regular
  - Boys
    - Polo shirt
      - Vest or sweater
      - Cloth trousers
      - Socks
      - Black shoes
  - Girls
    - Polo shirt
    - Vest or sweater
    - Knee-length skirt or dress (called jumper), pleated most of the time
    - Knee high socks (white for most public schools)
    - Black mary janes (elementary school) / black laced shoes (secondary school)
- P.E.

Note: The uniform is unisex most of the time.

  - Polo or shirt
  - Open sweatshirt
  - Sweatpants
  - socks and trainers (preferably white)

Nowadays, a complete school uniform set cost can go up to US$98.39 for girls, and US$102.32 for boys, which contradicts the uniforms implementation original goal during the 1930s: to reduce clothing costs and avoid classism.

In 2019, Mexico City's government announced a new Law that permitted pupils to choose whether to wear the trousers or skirt version of their regular uniform, regardless of their gender. If successful, this new practice might be implemented in other states of the republic.

== Federated States of Micronesia ==
The use of school uniforms is sporadic in Micronesian public schools.

=== Pohnpei ===
Students at Bailey Olter High School wear uniforms.

== Monaco ==
School uniform has been compulsory in Monegasque primary schools since 2019. Students are obliged to wear white polo shirts bearing their school's crest. In February 2026, uniforms will be introduced in a public secondary school for the first time.

== Moldova ==
In 2018, the Democratic Party of Moldova called for all Moldovan schools to adopt school uniform policies. The Ministry of Education backed the call but stressed uniforms could not be made mandatory. A survey of 300,000 students, teachers and parents recorded 82% of respondents as being in favour of introducing uniforms.

=== Transnistria ===
In October 2014, Vladimir Bodnar proposed the introduction of compulsory uniforms in Transnistrian schools. In April 2020, education minister Alla Nikolyuk renewed this proposal.

== Mongolia ==
In Mongolia, school uniforms are widespread in the public school system.

== Montenegro ==
In the Socialist Federal Republic of Yugoslavia, some schools enforced a mandatory uniform consisting of a navy blue "apron".

In August 2016, education minister Damir Šehović launched a school uniform pilot programme at Savo Pejanović Primary School in Podgorica, consisting of compulsory polo shirts.

== Montserrat ==
Students attending Montserrat Secondary School, the island's only high school, wear uniforms.

== Morocco ==
Historically, Moroccan primary and secondary schools students have worn the "apron" (Arabic: المريلة almarilati).

== Mozambique ==
Mozambican schools require students to wear uniforms.

== Myanmar ==
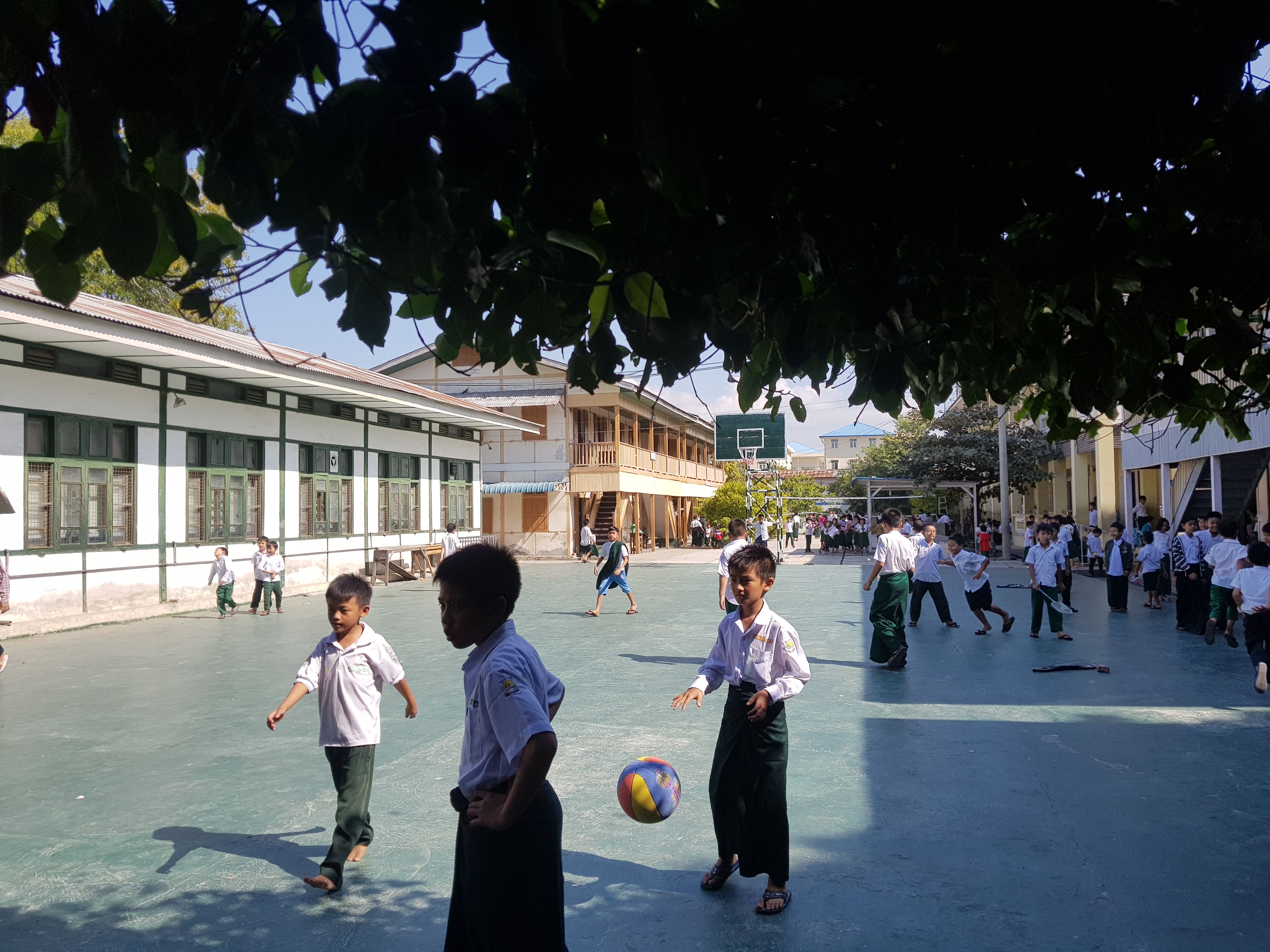
Students at a Basic Education School (public school) in Myanmar

School uniforms are mandatory throughout public schools in Myanmar, from kindergarten until the 10th standard. The current uniform rule, known as the "White-Green", was mandated on 14 February 1966. From kindergarten to the 4th standard, the compulsory uniform for boys is a white shirt and green pants, which can be short or long. Shoes and Burmese sandals may be worn. The uniform for girls is similar, consisting of a white blouse and a skirt or pants. From the 5th standard until matriculation, traditional Burmese attire is considered appropriate school uniform. The uniform for boys is a white shirt (with an english collar or a mandarin collar) and a green sarong called a pahso, along with Burmese sandals. For girls, a traditional Burmese blouse (either the yinzi, with a front opening, or the yin hpon, with a side opening) and a green sarong called a htamein are worn, along with Burmese sandals.

Public school teachers also have to wear the same traditional attire uniform as the students.

== Namibia ==
School uniforms are common in almost every school in Namibia, both private and state.

== Nauru ==
Nauruan schools require students to wear uniforms.

== Nepal ==
School uniforms are compulsory in Nepal in both public and private schools. The boys' uniforms are made of shirt with long or short sleeves, long trousers with various colours set by their school and girls uniforms with similar colours are often a shirt and a skirt.

Many schools require students to wear shoes, ties and ID cards, and schools has strict policies with hair styles and required to comb their hair down and keep it clean and short. Long hair is tied in braids. Uniform is one of the most important components of school life and is taken very seriously in Nepal.

== Netherlands ==
School uniforms are very rare in the Dutch education system. Their use is confined to international and private schools.

=== Bonaire ===
Students of Scholengemeenschap Bonaire, the sole high school on Bonaire, are required to wear uniform.

=== Saba ===
Students of Saba Comprehensive School, the sole high school on Saba, are required to wear uniform.

=== Sint Eustatius ===
Students of Gwendoline van Putten School, the sole high school on Sint Eustatius, are required to wear uniform.

== New Zealand ==
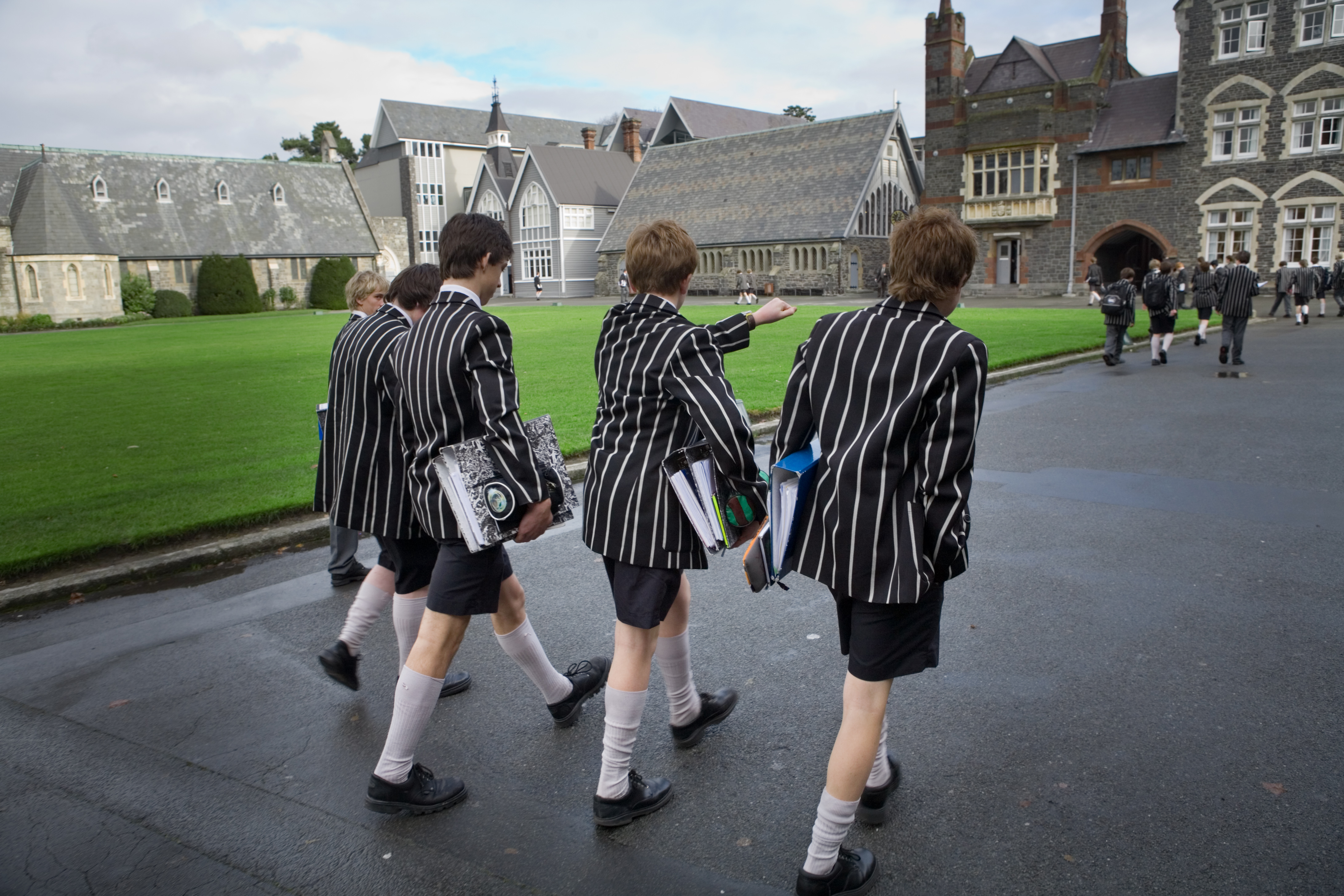
School boys in New Zealand

Traditionally, many New Zealand intermediate and high schools, and state-integrated and private primary schools, have followed the British system of school uniforms, although it is common in state schools for the boy's uniform to have a jersey and grey short trousers rather than a blazer with tie and long trousers. This usually consists of a variety of the following apparel: for boys, a business-style shirt with an official school tie, and long or short trousers; and for girls, a blouse, and a plain and/or plaid (usually tartan) skirt, and in some schools, especially in the South Island, kilts. Both sexes wear an 'official' school jersey. Blazers and jackets are of varied colours according to the school – dark or light blue, grey, crimson, scarlet, green or black. Some follow the British practice of having contrasting colours edging the lapels and jacket fronts. Caps have generally been discarded since the 1970s but in many primary schools there is a compulsory broad-brimmed floppy hat, in the school colours, to help prevent sunburn. Where short trousers are worn, boys are usually required to wear long socks, and garters are compulsory in many schools to hold socks up. Since 1990 an increasing number of schools, especially in the North Island, include sandals as the standard summer footwear. Many schools also allow students to attend barefoot, with a relatively large number of students choosing to do so.

During the 1980s and 1990s there was a tendency for the traditional uniform to be replaced by cheaper and more 'modern' options: polo shirts, polar fleece tops, or a complete doing away with uniforms in favour of mufti. Intermediate schools usually provide the option of skirts or culottes for girls and sometimes shorts while boys will wear shorts. Bike shorts or tights are sometimes worn under girls' skirts and dresses. Some high schools have introduced trousers as an option for girls instead of skirts, however demand is low with several Christchurch high schools estimating only 1% of girls at their respective schools wear trousers.

=== Tokelau ===
All three schools in Tokelau enforce uniform policies.

== Nicaragua ==
On 18 September 1979, an administrative decree introduced a mandatory uniform of white shirts and blue pants or skirts in all Nicaraguan public and private schools.

== Niger ==
Uniforms are widely worn in Nigerien schools.

== Nigeria ==
School uniforms are used in Nigeria for all public and private schools from nursery school through primary and secondary school. This originally came with the introduction of western education by Christian missionaries and the tradition continued during the colonial era up till the current era of independence. Some schools have so-called mufti days where this requirement is voided.

== Niue ==
Niue's sole primary and secondary schools both require uniforms.

== North Korea ==
All North Korean students in schools are required to wear uniforms. Makeup is prohibited until graduation from high school. Dress codes in universities vary with some requiring uniforms and others requiring formal wear.

== Norway ==
School uniforms are generally absent from the Norwegian education system, except in certain international schools.

== North Macedonia ==
In September 2014, school uniform was made compulsory for all elementary students in the Municipality of Aerodrom in Skopje. Several secondary schools in Skopje also enforce uniform policies.

== Oman ==
In March 2019, the Ministry of Education announced Omani public school students would be required to wear dishdashas for the 2019/2020 academic year.

== Pakistan ==
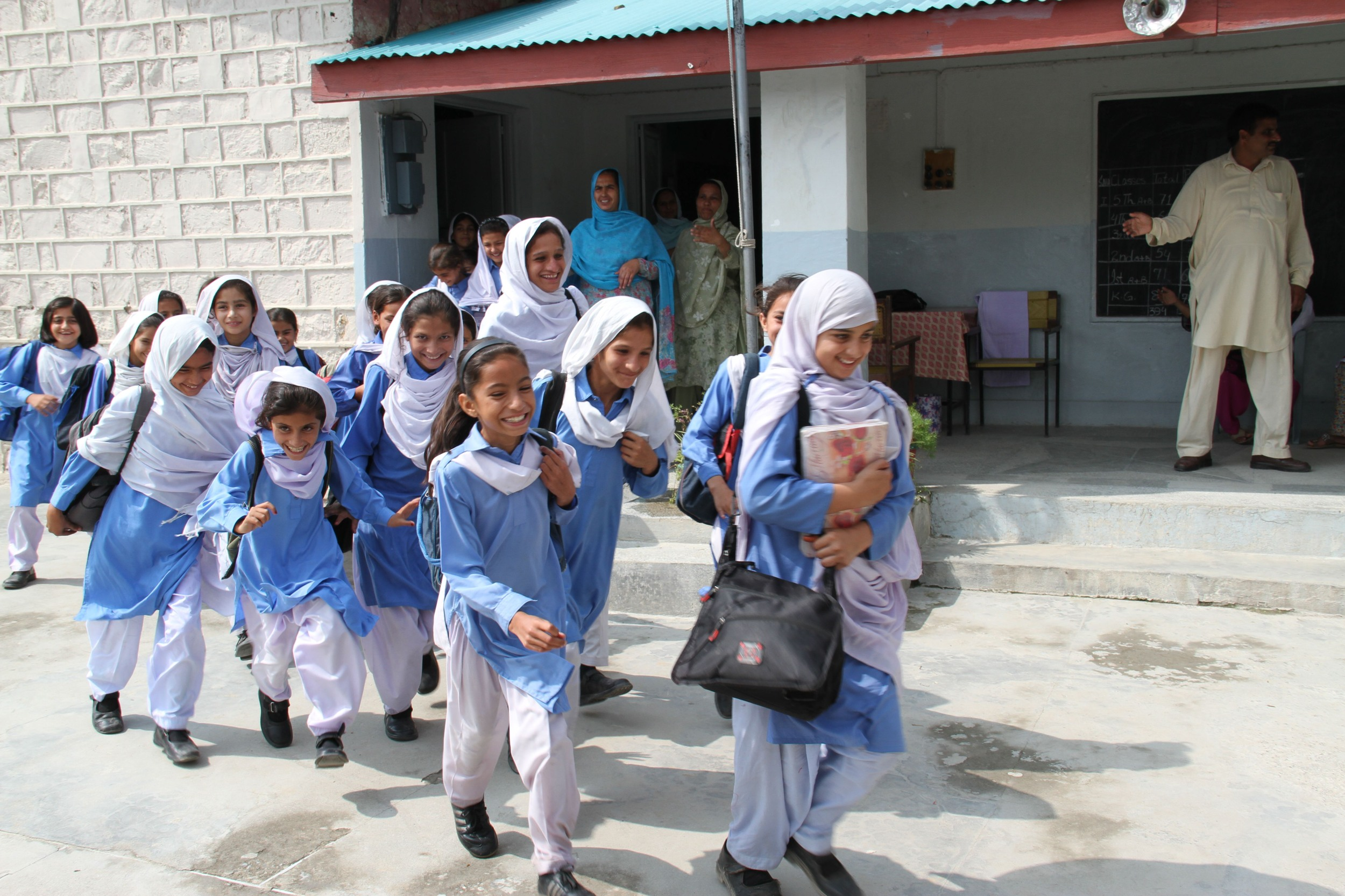
Primary schoolgirls in Pakistan

School uniforms are compulsory in most schools in Pakistan. Both the public and the private schools have mandated uniforms. Boys uniforms are often made of a light-coloured shirt, long trousers usually brown or blue. The girls often wear Shalwar Qameez suit or in some schools shirt and skirt.

== Palau ==
School uniform is compulsory for Palauan schoolchildren.

== Papua New Guinea ==
Papua New Guinean schools generally require uniforms.

== Palestine ==
Palestinian schoolchildren are required to wear uniform.

=== Gaza Strip ===
Since 2009, the Hamas administration in the Gaza Strip has periodically pressured girls' secondary schools to adopt more conservative uniform policies, such as requiring students to cover their hair.

== Panama ==
School uniform is mandatory in Panamanian schools. A Ministry of Education decree temporarily relaxing these rules for the 2022 academic year caused controversy, with parents fearing it would lead to a rise in bullying.

== Paraguay ==
Uniforms were introduced in Paraguayan schools at the end of the 19th century and have been worn ever since.

== Peru ==
School uniforms are used in Peru. Almost all private schools, especially the British ones, use school uniforms.

== Philippines ==
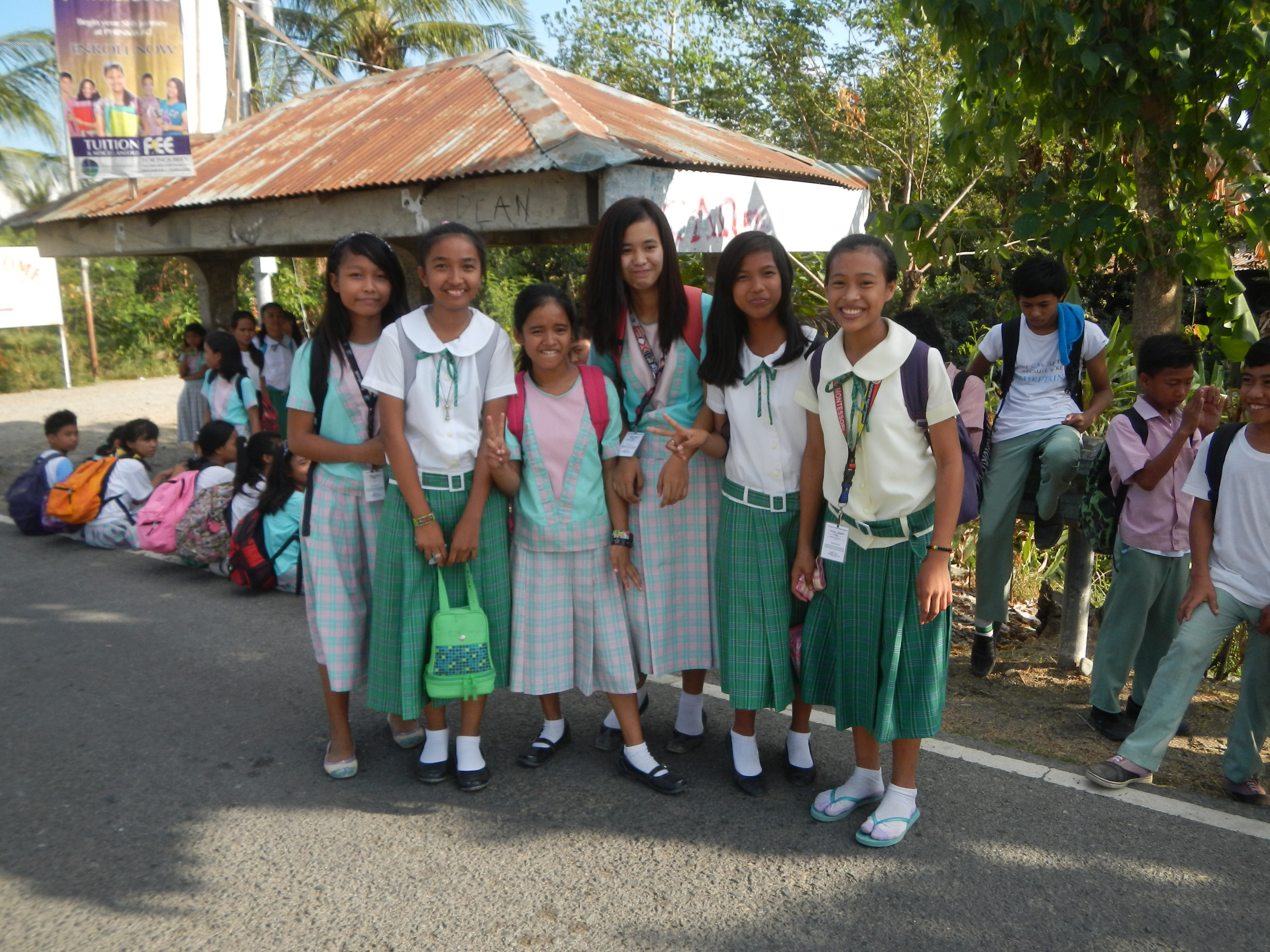
Female high school students in school uniform at Licab, Nueva Ecija

School uniforms (Filipino: uniporme or kasuotang pampáaralán, "school attire"), are commonplace in public schools and required in private schools. Some private schools allow civilian clothing on special days, typically parties, school holidays or last day of school before a break. There is usually no uniform in universities and progressive schools, except for official athletic wear in physical education classes, and in specific schools such as the University of Santo Tomas.

Schools usually have two sets of uniform, a regular uniform and a physical education (PE) uniform, the latter worn once a week (usually Fridays):

- Regular uniform
  - Boys
    - Plain white or collared polo shirt with chest pocket, usually short-sleeved with school insignia. Some private schools may add a necktie, and use a long-sleeved shirt under a vest or blazer.
    - Pants or shorts (usually black, navy blue or khaki). Shorts usually worn up to elementary level.
    - White or black socks, and black leather shoes
  - Girls
    - Short-sleeved collared blouse (usually with sailor or Peter Pan collar), usually with necktie or ribbon matching the colours of the skirt, or worn with jumper dress or blazer
    - Plain or plaid skirt, usually pleated and covers the knees
    - Plain or plaid jumper dress, usually pleated and covers the knees (some schools)
    - Collared dress with necktie or ribbon (some schools)
    - White socks and black shoes (preferably Mary Janes or ballet flats)
- Physical education uniform (unisex)
  - T-shirt with school seal, crest or logo
  - Sweatpants ("jogging pants"), usually in primary school colour
  - Sneakers (usually white)

Muslim girls in some higher institutions are often required to wear a white hijab, and may be allowed much longer skirts than Christian girls.

Elementary and high school students at both private and public schools also wear Scouting uniforms at least once a week (usually Thursdays). Boy Scouts wear a Boy Scout T-shirt or khaki Boy Scout polo shirt and khaki pants or shorts, black leather shoes and socks, and a neckerchief with carabao fastener (colour depends on age level). The baseball cap is optional. Girl Scouts wear a Girl Scout T-shirt and dark green shorts (usually for Twinkler and Star Scouts) or a dark green collared knee-length Girl Scout dress, worn with black shoes and white socks, a yellow neckerchief and fastener and an optional green baseball hat.

Members of secondary school CAT cadet units and ROTC units of the National Service Training Program in institutions of higher education wear as a general rule military style attire depending on circumstances (The other two tracks of the NSTP are not required to wear such uniforms).

The material for these usually loose uniforms are often light and suited to the country's tropical climate (e.g. cotton).

In 2008, the Department of Education ordered that students are no longer required to wear uniforms. This was to enable poorer families to save money for basic needs.

== Poland ==
School uniforms are not compulsory in Poland and absent from the vast majority of Polish schools. In the People's Republic of Poland, uniform ceased to be compulsory in most schools during the 1980s due to economic issues. Since then, there has been made only one effort to reintroduce uniform into Polish schools – by the former minister of education Roman Giertych, in 2006. It was then decided that school uniform would not be enforced by the state onto the whole country, but would be a matter decided upon by the principal of each school respectively. Initially this was meant to permit only a dress code, but this was later modified in 2007 to address school uniform. From 2007, all primary schools and middle schools were to enforce compulsory uniform, whilst high schools and other forms of further education were given the choice to decide on their own. The appearance of school uniform was decided upon locally, which meant that "uniform" in most schools consisted of a jacket or shirt only – selected by the school management purely to avoid breaking regulations (the rest of clothing was still up to the students to decide). By mid-2008, compulsory school uniforms were repealed and it remains so to this day.

== Portugal ==
Students are required to wear uniforms at most Portuguese private schools, especially those in Lisbon and Porto. Use in state schools is rare.

== Qatar ==
Qatari public and private schools require students to wear uniform.

== Romania ==
School uniforms were introduced to Romania in 1897 by academician Theodor Costescu when they worn by students in Turnu Severin. Its use broadened in tandem with Spiru Haret's educational reforms in the 1900s. Uniforms fell out of favour somewhat in the 1990s due to their association with the Socialist Republic of Romania. Uniforms are mostly worn in private institutions and some state schools. In August 2022, Minister of Education Sorin Cîmpeanu spoke in favour of making school uniform mandatory in Romanian schools. In September 2026 a new proposal was passed in the Senate. This proposal was protested countrywide by students, who wore black T-shirts.

== Russia ==
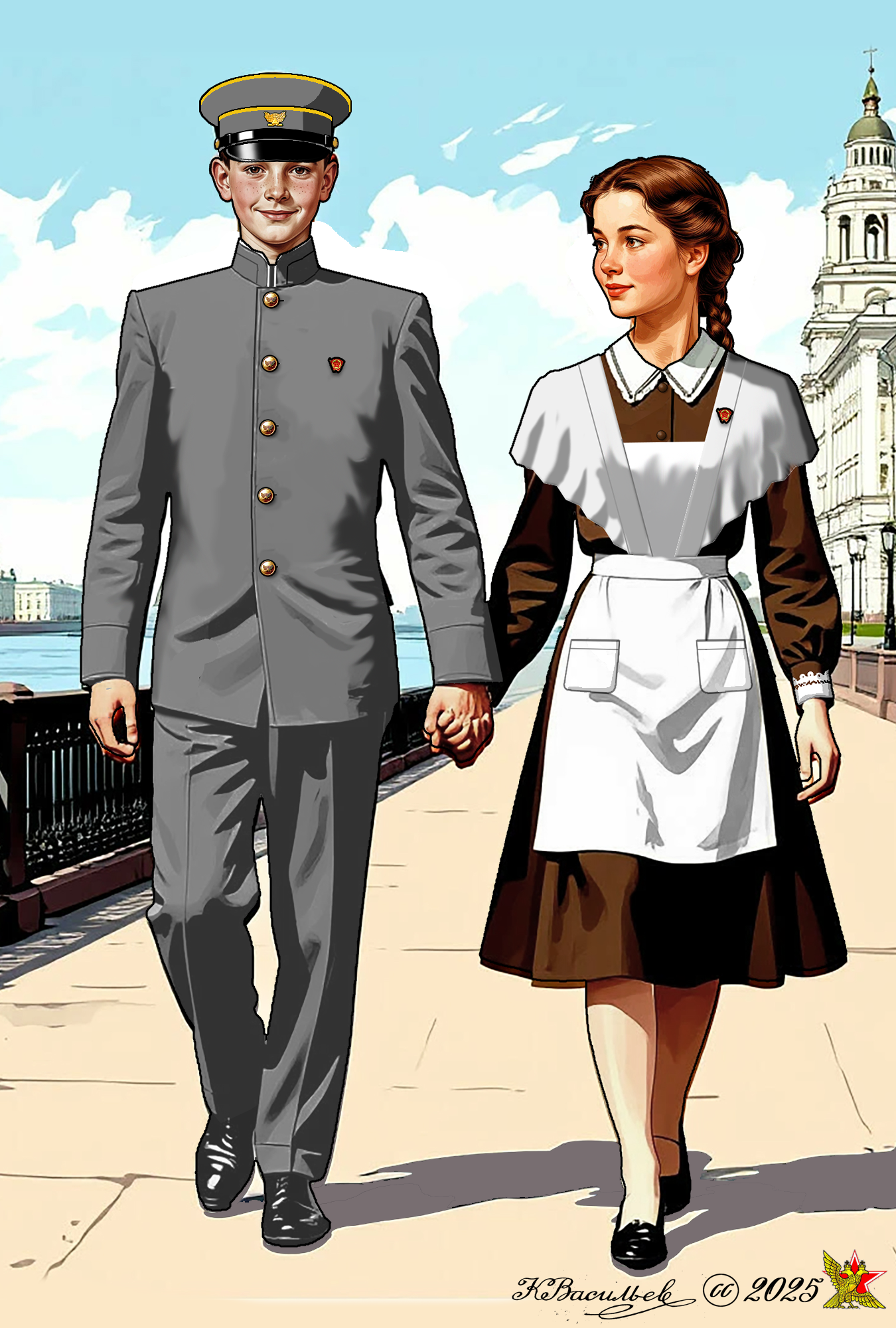
Uniform for high school students model 1954 (In use 1954–1962).

In 1834, Nicholas I introduced a mandatory uniform for gymnasium students in the Russian Empire. Following the 1917 Russian Revolution, their use ceased until 1949, when a standardised "universal" uniform began to be worn in all schools.

Originally consisting of a military style with peaked cap and high collared tunic, by the 1980s boys wore a functional dark blue pattern with shoulder patches. For formal occasions such as the first day of term, girls wore white lace collars and aprons dating back to the reign of Catherine the Great. During the initial-post Soviet period from 1994 to 2013, the mandatory uniform policy was abandoned and pupils generally wore casual clothing such as jeans, T-shirts and sweaters. However, uniforms were reintroduced under a new education law in September 2013. Among the supporters of the new uniform law of 2013, arguments included tackling social inequality, but also putting an end to the controversial problem of whether school students are allowed to wear traditional religious clothing to school.

Each school can now choose its own uniform. Also, there are many instances in which schools do not enforce the rules on school uniform. Generally, schools without school uniforms enforce dress-code, with "business-casual" style of clothes.

== Rwanda ==
Most Rwandan schools enforce uniform policies. In general, girls are made to wear skirts and dresses while boys wear shorts or trousers.

== Saint Helena, Ascension and Tristan da Cunha ==
=== Saint Helena ===
St Helena Secondary School, the island's only such school, requires students to wear uniform.

=== Ascension Island ===
Two Boats School, Ascension Island's only school, requires students to wear uniform.

=== Tristan da Cunha ===
St. Mary's School, Tristan da Cunha's only school, does not require students to wear uniform.

== Saint Kitts and Nevis ==
School uniform is mandatory in Kittian and Nevisian schools. The government operates a School Uniform Assistance Programme to help citizens meet the associated costs.

== Saint Lucia ==
School uniforms are worn in Saint Lucian schools.

== Saint Vincent and the Grenadines ==
Vincentian schools enforce strict uniform policies.

== Samoa ==
School uniforms are mandatory in Samoan schools.

== São Tomé and Príncipe ==
São Toméan schools require students to wear uniforms.

== Saudi Arabia ==
In August 2015, ahead of the 2015–16 academic year, new standardised uniforms were introduced for all girls studying in Saudi public schools, Quran memorization schools and schools for illiterate adult women. In most schools, boys wear a thobe, and girls wear a maryoul or a skirt with a shirt .

== Senegal ==
In 2021, the Senegalese government announced plans to generalise the wearing of compulsory school uniforms in all public and private schools by 2023.

== Serbia ==
In the Socialist Federal Republic of Yugoslavia, some schools enforced a mandatory uniform consisting of a navy blue "apron" (Serbian: кецеља kècelja). In 2016, Minister of Education Mladen Šarčević called for the introduction of uniforms in Serbian schools.

In September 2017, at least 100 primary schools had adopted school uniforms. Since then, the municipality of Medijana has annually provided cohorts of new primary school students with uniforms at the start of the academic year.

== Seychelles ==
Uniforms are compulsory in Seychellois schools.

In January 2006, Director General of Schools Jeanne Simeon announced standardised uniforms for primary schools based on region, with each having its own uniform colour:

- North (Anse Etoile, Beau Vallon, Bel Ombre, Glacis and La Retraite): Big and small blue-green stripes
- East (Anse Royale, Anse Aux Pins, Cascade and Takamaka): Red stripes
- Central (Bel Eau, Mont Fleuri, La Rosière and Plaisance): Red with small squares
- West (Anse Boileau, Baie Lazare, Grand Anse Mahe and Port Glaud): Blue stripes
- Inner Islands (Baie Ste Anne, Grand Anse Praslin, La Digue and Silhouette): Small dark-green squares

All secondary school students wear white poplin blouses and shirts. Boys in all schools wear khaki pants while girls wear blue skirts.

== Sierra Leone ==
Uniforms are prevalent in Sierra Leonean schools. At present, most uniforms are made from poplin or cotton, although there are a few private primary schools that use locally-produced gara tie-dyed cloth.

== Sint Maarten ==
School uniforms are compulsory in Sint Maarten schools.

== Slovakia ==
In Slovakia, use of school uniforms is confined to private and international schools.

== Slovenia ==
In the Socialist Republic of Slovenia, schoolchildren were obliged to wear the red-starred blue cap and red scarf of the Union of Pioneers of Yugoslavia. Since 1991, use of school uniform in Slovenia has been limited to private institutions, such as British International School of Ljubljana.

== Solomon Islands ==
Solomon Islander schoolchildren wear uniforms.

== Somalia ==
In the Somali Democratic Republic era, uniforms were worn widely in Somali schools.

=== Somaliland ===
In the autonomous Republic of Somaliland, school uniforms are mandatory.

== South Africa ==
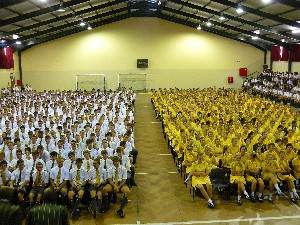
Typical example of an assembly in a South African school. All students are in uniform, with a sharp difference between the sexes.

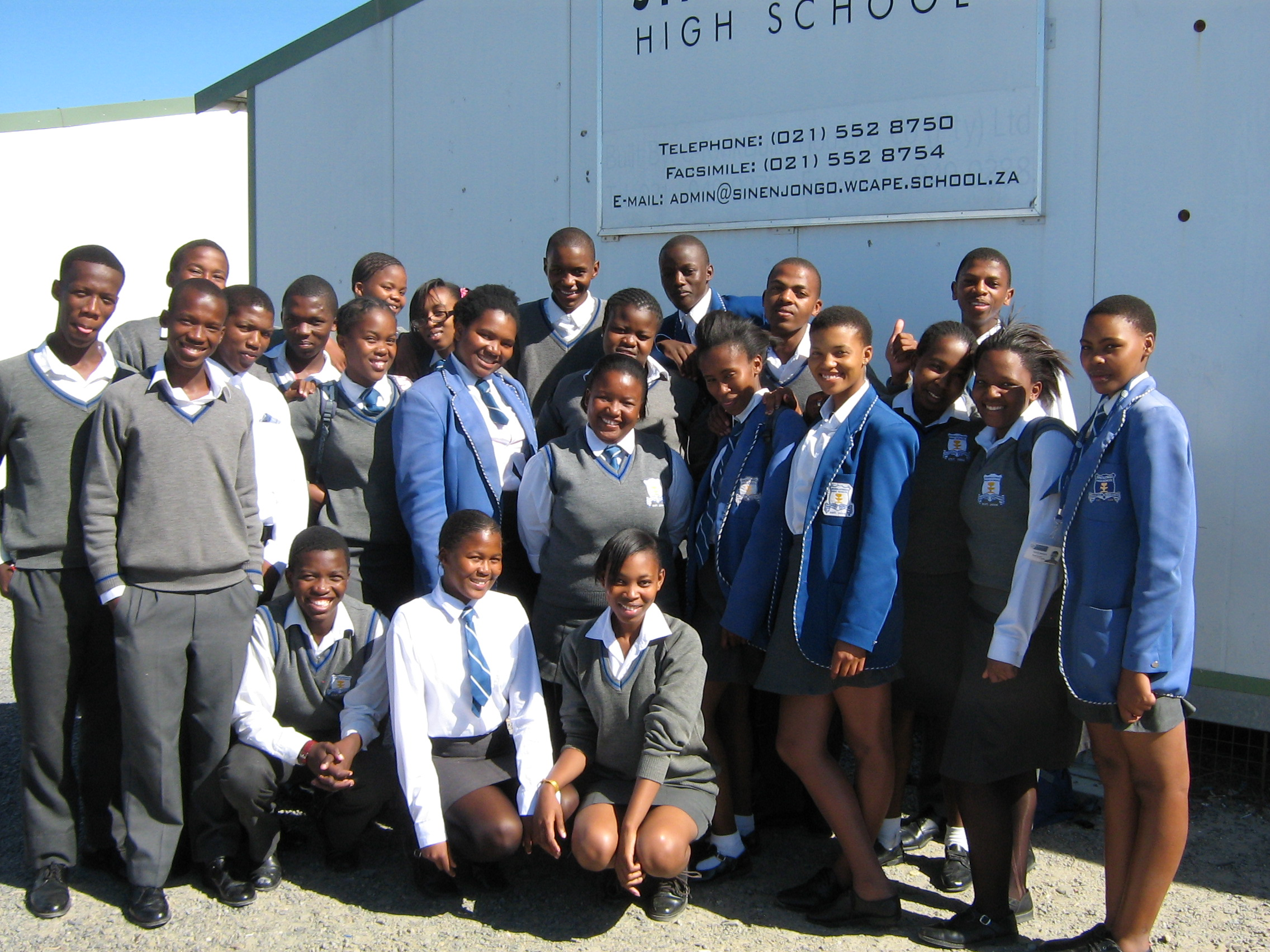
Students of Sinenjongo High School in Cape Town, South Africa.

As in many other former British colonies, most South African private and public schools have a uniform, and it is compulsory in all public schools and in the vast majority of private schools for children above pre-school level. Uniform types vary less between public and private schools than they do across regions, where schools in more rural areas tend to forgo the daily wearing of ties and/or blazers for boys and girls regardless of their public or private nature. However, many of these same schools will have a "number ones" uniform for special occasions that include such items. In cities such as Cape Town, on the other hand, it is more common to see formal apparel required in public and private schools on a daily basis.

Many schools across South Africa also provide the choice between a summer and winter uniform, with khaki uniforms and brown shoes being very common in the summer. Although many schools allow girls to also wear trousers (especially during winter months) South African law has not required gender neutrality in school dress codes and a distinction between girls' and boys' uniforms remains. Boys of all ages are normally required to wear grey or khaki long or short trousers with socks, and the socks are usually long when worn with shorts, as in the illustration (right). Until recently, the straw boater was a common accessory in affluent public and private high schools, although these have now become optional in some cases.

Nearly all schools, public or fee paying, have sports' kits (uniforms) that often allow bare feet for junior schools, regardless of the season.

== South Korea ==
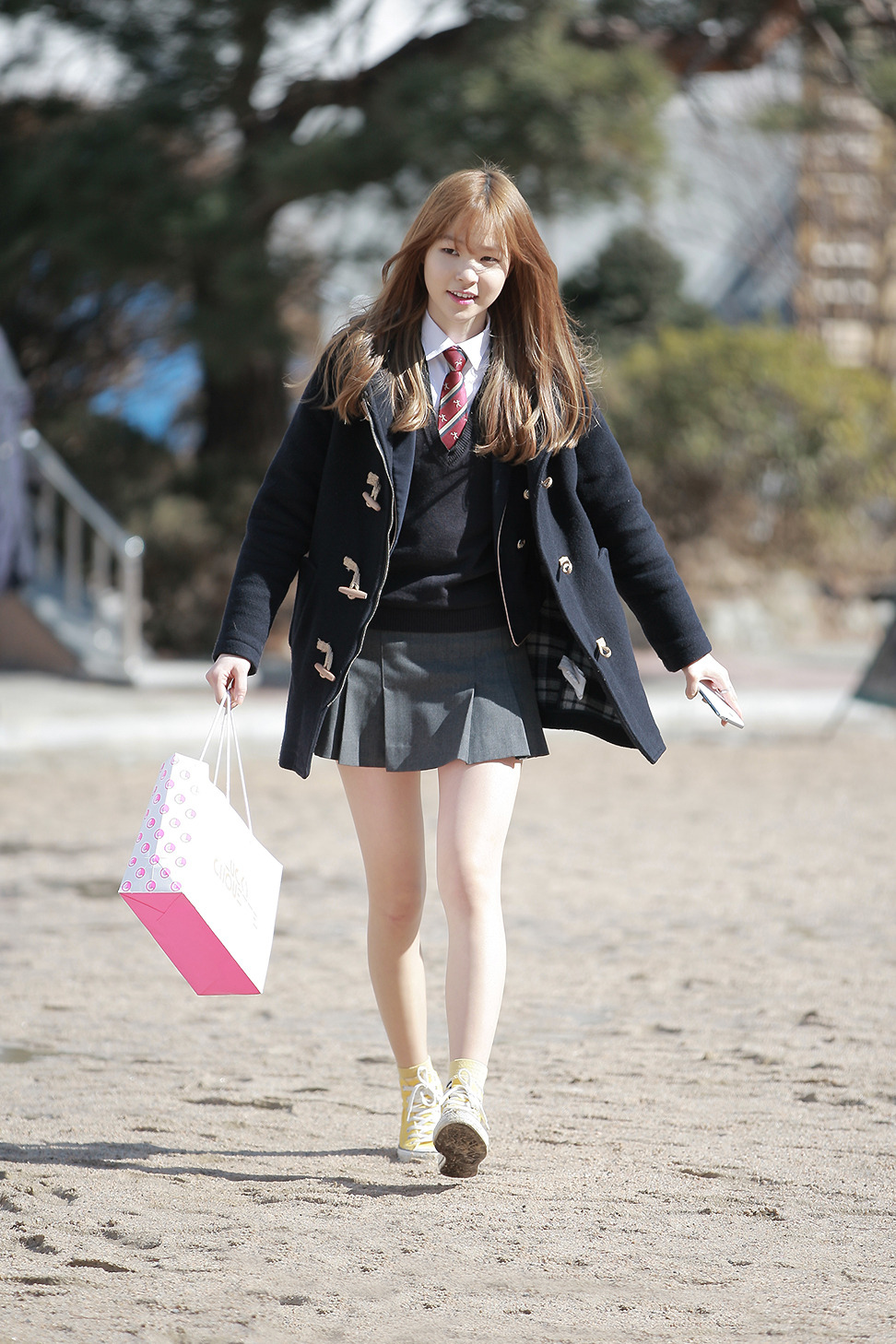
South Korean school uniform

Almost all South Korean secondary students wear a uniform called "gyobok" (Korean: 교복, 校服). The majority of elementary schools, except some private ones, do not have uniforms; however, the uniform is strictly monitored from the start of middle school and up. Based on Western-style ones, the South Korean uniform usually consists of a shirt, blazer and tie, with skirts for girls and trousers for boys.

More recently, the uniform is often worn by celebrities who target the younger, teen audience to sell entertainment products. The school uniform and school setting is frequently used as a venue for romance. As a result, the uniform has become something akin to an expression of fashion among students.

Name tags that are worn usually have different colours per grade. Oftentimes the writing is in black or white, whereas the background is coloured.

== South Sudan ==
Students are required to wear uniforms in many schools across South Sudan.

== Spain ==
In Spain, the use of school uniforms is not compulsory in public schools at any specific point. Their usage is decided upon by school boards, with parents' thoughts and opinions taken into account. It is customary to wear uniforms in private schools, where typically girls wear shirts emblazoned with the school's emblem and a jersey skirt, while boys wear a white shirt and tie on top with trousers or shorts on bottom.

== Sri Lanka ==
It is mandatory for Sri Lankan school students to wear a uniform regardless of them attending a government, semi-government or private school. In most government and semi-government schools, boys will wear a short-sleeved white shirt and navy blue shorts when they are in the junior grades. This will later transition to white shorts and then to white trousers towards the latter part of the school life. A tie is not always worn, but may be worn for special school events along with a long-sleeved shirt. Proper black dress shoes and socks are also a part of this uniform. Certain schools also require the uniform to have the school's insignia stitched to a corner of the pocket of the shirt.

Girls who attend government and semi-government schools will wear a white one-piece dress. This may or may not have sleeves. Certain schools make wearing a tie mandatory for girls and some may have a plastic badge or the school's insignia stitched to the dress. Proper dress shoes and socks are mandatory in most schools.

On special occasions, students who bear a post in a sports team, club, or association would wear a blazer that would normally be white and having accents based on the school colours.

In privately run schools, the suit is very similar but the colours might differ. They range from khaki and dark green to bright blue.

== Sudan ==
Sudanese schoolchildren are required to wear uniforms.

== Suriname ==
School uniform is compulsory in Surinamese schools.

== Sweden ==
Uniforms are exceptionally rare in Swedish schools, being limited to independent and international schools such as Sigtunaskolan Humanistiska Läroverket and the Nordic International School. In 2017, the Swedish Schools Inspectorate ruled students at Nordic International School's Norrköping campus could not be disciplined for not complying with the school's uniform policy.

== Switzerland ==
In Switzerland, use of school uniforms is limited to international and other private schools.

== Syria ==
Up until 2003, public school students in Ba'ath Party-governed Syria wore military khaki-coloured uniforms. In April 2003, the Ministry of Education announced plans to replace these with unified blue uniforms for all elementary students; pink and blue uniforms for intermediate schools students; and gray, blue and pink uniforms for secondary school students. In September 2003, the new uniforms were implemented as planned.

== Taiwan ==
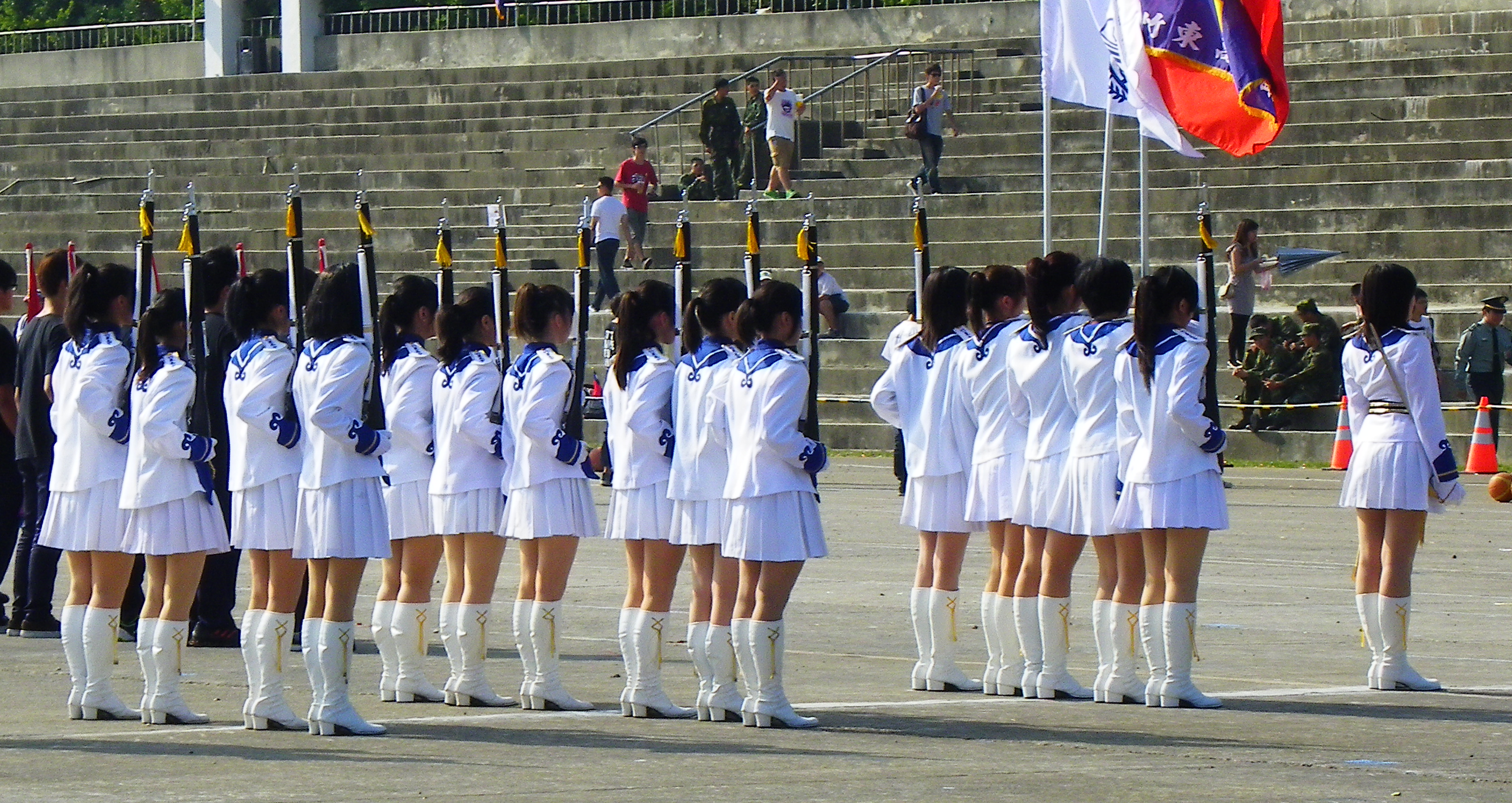
High school girls in uniform during a school ceremony in Taiwan.

As Taiwan experienced a long period of Japanese colonial rule, it is influenced by Japanese culture and the uniform style can be said to be close. However the school uniforms in the two countries are not identical. Recently, school uniforms in Taiwan inspired from Catholic school uniforms that used in Western schools (e.g. shirt, blazer, tie, skirts/trousers)—For tie and skirts/trousers, they are available in plain/tartan patterns.

There are a total of 471 Taiwanese high schools. All schools have two sets of uniforms, a summer uniform and a uniform for winter. According to the provisions, sportswear is worn.

Summer

Elementary school (Chinese: 國小)：White short trousers and shirts are most common for the boys, while girls will wear a pleated skirt

Junior high school (Chinese: 國中)：Males wear short-sleeved shirts with shorts. Females wear shirts with pleated skirts or skirt trousers. Some schools have sailor uniforms.

Senior high school (Chinese: 高中)：Short sleeved shirts with long trousers for males, pleated skirts for females in public schools; private schools will always have skirts

Winter

Long trousers and long sleeved shirts are worn in most schools.

In the past, many schools had khaki uniforms but this has been phased out with the exception of a few schools.

A few high schools, mostly those with higher entry exam requirements, allow students to not wear uniforms.

== Tajikistan ==
School uniforms are worn in Tajikistani public schools.

== Tanzania ==
School uniforms are a mandatory requirement in Tanzanian schools.

== Thailand ==
Works related to Student Uniform Act, BE 2551 (2008) at Wikisource

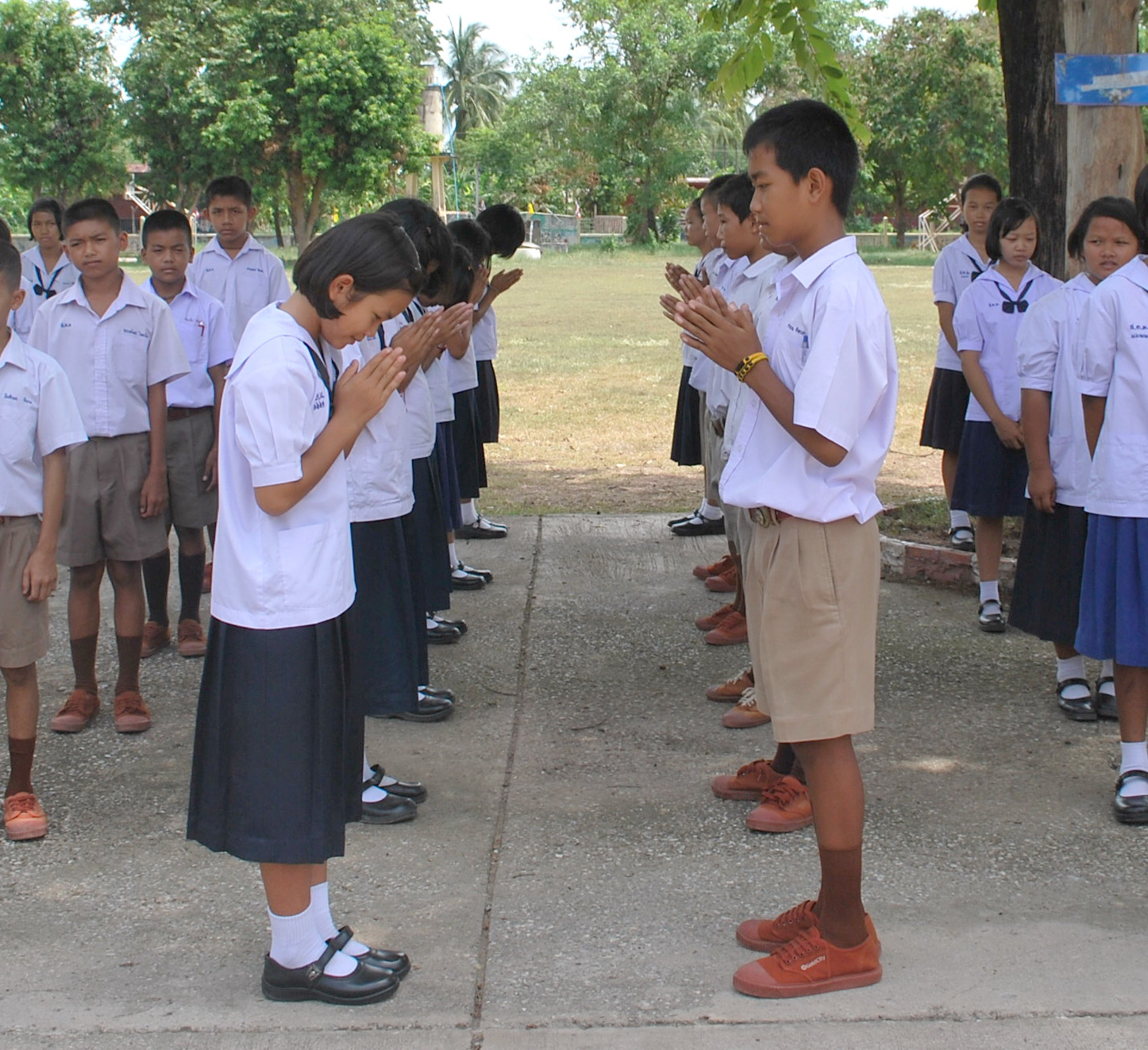
Thai students wearing school uniforms

Uniforms are compulsory for all students with very few variations from the standard model throughout the public and private school systems, including colleges and universities.

The dress code in primary and secondary grades for boys comprises dark blue, khaki, or black shorts with a white open-collar short-sleeved shirt, white ankle socks or long dark socks, and brown or black trainers. Female students wear a knee-length dark blue or black skirt, and a pale white blouse with a loosely hanging bow tie. From Matthayom 4 (equivalent to 11th grade) and onwards, female students stop wearing bowties.

The female student uniform is complemented by white ankle socks and black school shoes. The student's name, number, and name of the school are often embroidered on the blouse or shirt. Some independent or international schools have uniforms more closely resembling British school uniform standards, and boys in senior high school grades may be allowed to wear long trousers. The standard dress for children in kindergarten is a red skirt and white blouse for girls, and red short trousers and a white shirt for boys. Every week in all Thai schools, a day, usually Wednesday, is dedicated to scouting. The boy scout uniform consists of khaki shirts, shorts, brown belt, and shoes, while the girl scout uniform consists of green or blue shirts and skirts. Both uniforms include shoulder markings, hats/berets, and scarves, and can vary slightly from school to school

The hairstyle of students is also given attention by schools and the Ministry of Education. Males are not allowed to have long hair. Some schools even prohibit girls from having long hair. The use of accessories is prohibited for males, while females are sometimes allowed to use simple accessories. Some schools dictate the colour and type of hair accessories that females can use.

Thailand however has a few international schools that do not require uniforms.

== Togo ==
Upon independence in 1960, Togolese public schools retained the mandatory khaki-coloured uniforms that were introduced during French colonial rule.

== Tonga ==
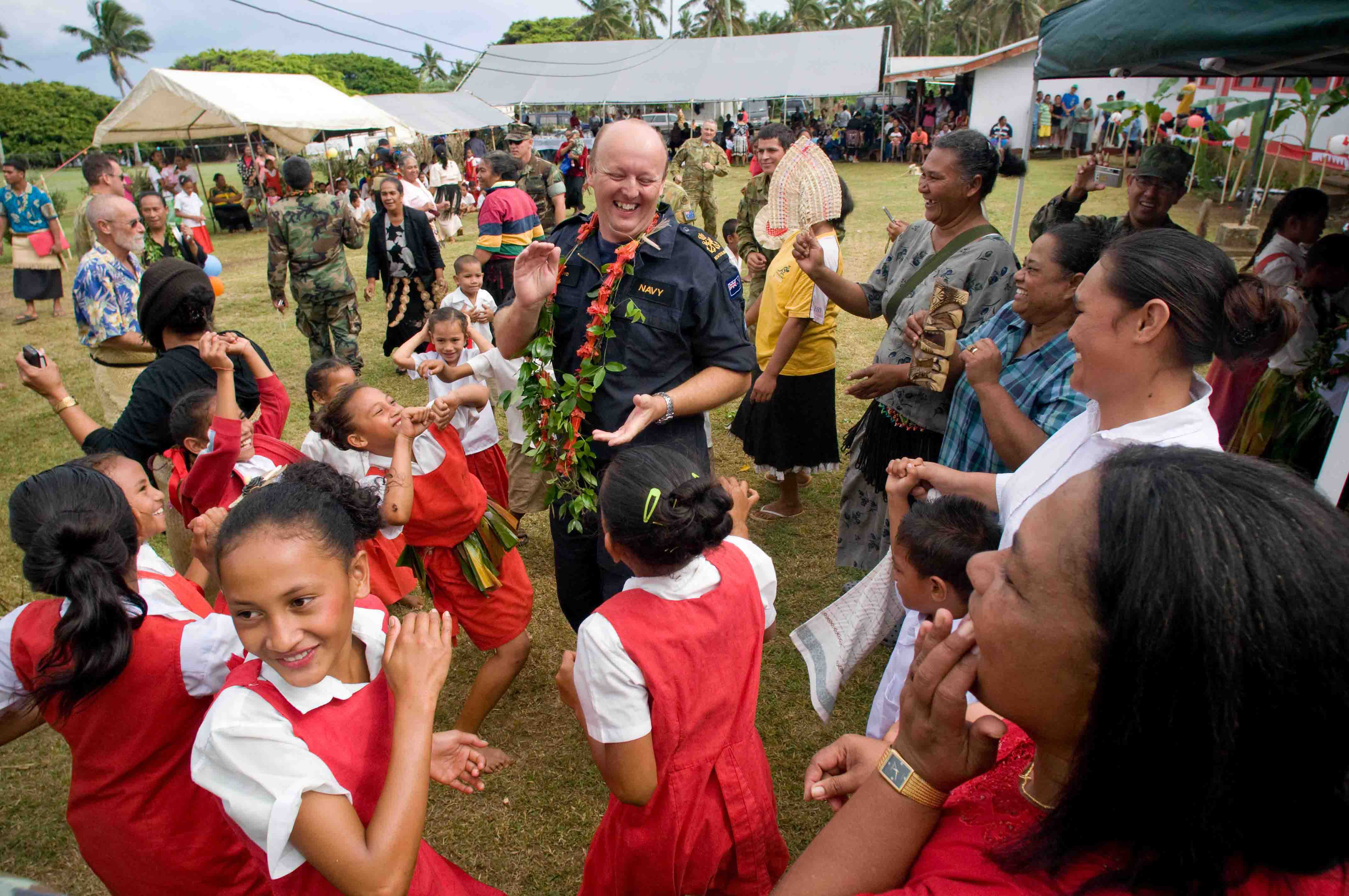
Royal New Zealand Navy Petty Officer Richard Boyd dances with Tongan school children during a Pacific Partnership 2009 community service project at Faleloa Primary School.

In Tonga all schools require a uniform. Uniforms are usually in the colours of their respective churches and Red for Government Schools. Catholic schools are usually light blue, Wesleyan (Royal Blue), Anglican (Navy Blue) and LDS Schools (Green). A ta'ovala bordered with school colours and a tupenu are usually worn by boys with a white button-up shirt. Pupils usually wear shorts and a white button up shirt. Nearly all Tongan secondary schools require girls to wear a pinafore dress with a white shirt, except for Catholic schools, which allow a striped blouse and skirt. Pupils are usually required to wear Roman sandals in English-medium schools, and thongs (flip-flops) in most other schools.

== Trinidad and Tobago ==
School uniforms are worn in all Trinidadian and Tobagonian public schools.

== Tunisia ==
As of 2017, Tunisian public high schools enforce dress codes which apply exclusively to female students, obliging them to wear long blue gilets.

== Turkey ==
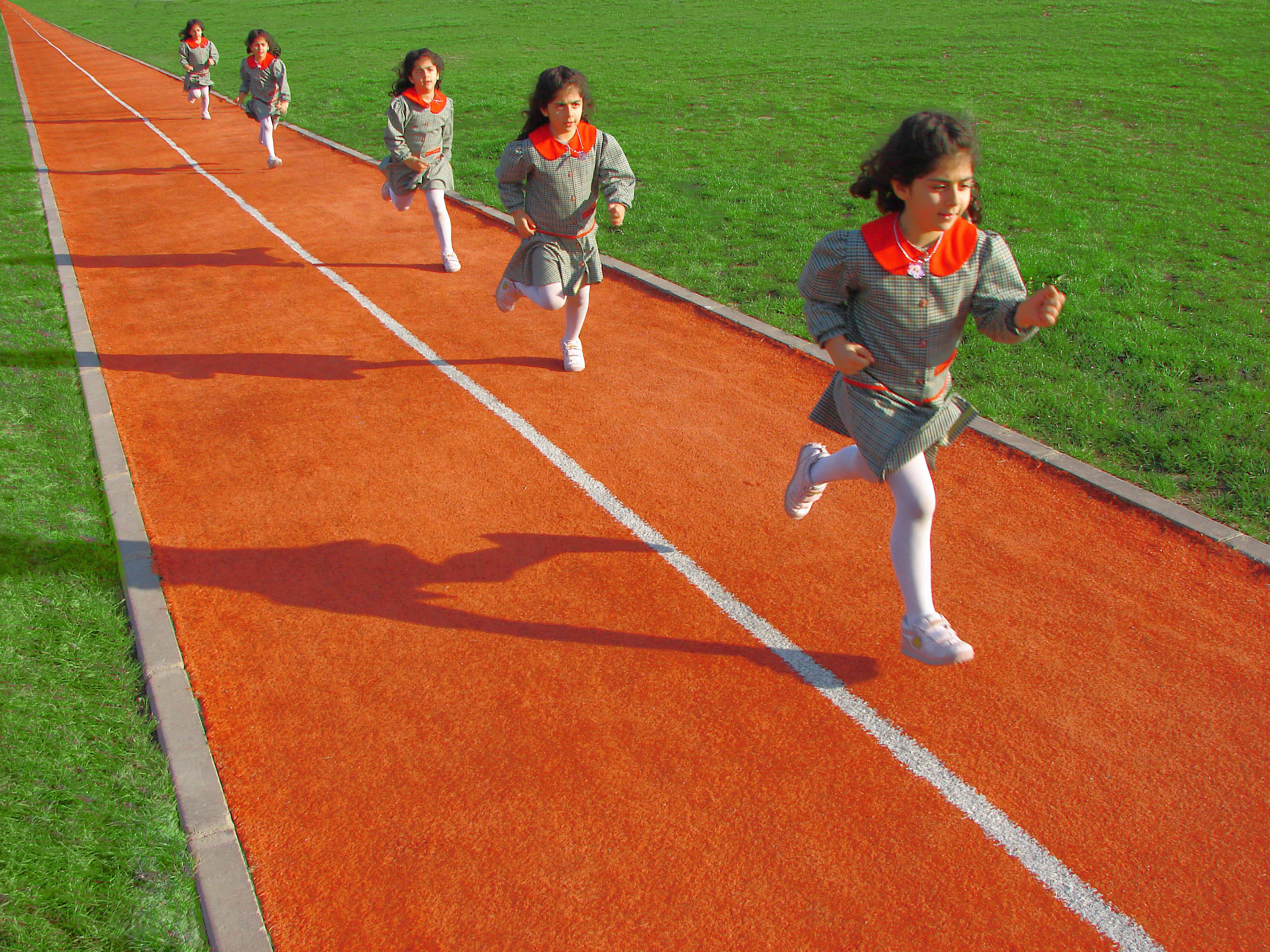
Turkish school uniforms.

Up until 2012, school uniforms were used in all public and private institutions. There were several exceptions and most kindergartens did not require school uniforms. The uniforms varied in their appearance; primary schools used one-piece blue uniforms, while in secondary and high schools boys wore dark grey trousers with white shirts, jackets and a tie. Girls had skirts and shirts coloured like the boys' uniform, plus a tie. Most private institutions have their own uniforms. School uniforms for primary schools were black until the 1990s. None of the universities or higher-education institutes have uniforms.

School uniforms abolished in 2012 and schools gave a poll to families to select uniform or casual cloths. Dress code says that students' shoulder should be covered, girls cannot wear leggings or miniskirts. This caused a controversy in Western cities since some students were wearing miniskirts, shorts and leggings. New law says that students can wear hijabs at school but it's prohibited to wear makeup, tattoos, piercings, dyed hair, etc.

School uniforms have a long history in Turkey. They were first introduced because normal clothing would give hints about the child's family's economic situation. To prevent groupings amongst children from different social classes, uniforms were accepted.

However, school uniforms were officially abolished on 27 November 2012, when the Turkish Ministry of Education suddenly abolished the nationwide uniform requirement in schools (international/foreign schools are excluded) and lifted the headscarf ban for religious imam-hatip schools, prompting fierce criticism from opposition parties, unions and educators. Opponents claim that economic differences cause pedagogical traumas for children and that permitting headscarves harms secular education. Prime Minister Recep Tayyip Erdoğan defended the move, saying education in uniform has drawn complaints for many years. But students attending minority schools (Greeks, Jews, and Armenians), which are also part of the Turkish Ministry of Education, have been excluded from this change, and are still required to wear school uniforms.

On 6 December 2024, after 12 years, uniform dress code has been reinstated.

== Turkmenistan ==
Uniforms are compulsory in Turkmenstani schools. Girls’ uniforms are entirely based on national costumes. They include bright green, ankle-length dresses decorated with embroidery. Male and female students must wear takhyas. Girls sport two long braids, and those with short hair attach fake plaits to their takhyas to meet the requirements. The strict dress code was imposed under President Saparmurat Niyazov. The obligation to wear national costume is unpopular among some ethnically non-Turkmen students.

== Turks and Caicos Islands ==
School uniforms are worn by students at all levels throughout the Turks and Caicos Islands.

== Tuvalu ==
Section 10.2.1 of Tuvalu's National Education Policy obliges all children attending public schools to wear the approved national school uniform.

== Uganda ==
Most Ugandan public and private schools have uniforms from kindergarten through secondary school. These mostly range from dresses, skirts and blouses, pinafores, blazers, neckties for female students to shirts and trousers or shorts, blazers and neckties for male students. A few schools allow female students to wear pants. A few international schools do not enforce school uniforms.

== Ukraine ==
In June 2019, President Volodymyr Zelenskyy repealed a 1996 decree that had obliged Ukrainian secondary school students to wear compulsory uniforms.

== United Arab Emirates ==
Uniforms are compulsory in many schools across the United Arab Emirates.

In June 2013, the Abu Dhabi Education Council standardised the uniforms for pupils in public schools across Abu Dhabi. Uniforms include options for varying weather conditions. Boys in Kindergarten and Cycle 1 (Grades 1 to 5) can wear either a long-sleeved shirt and trousers or a short-sleeved shirt and shorts. Tie, winter blazer, and cardigan are optional. Boys in Cycle 2 and Cycle 3 (Grades 6 to 12) wear a kandoora (traditional white robe) and ghetra (head scarf). Pullover sweater or blazer are optional Girls in Kindergarten or Cycle 1 (Grades 1 to 5) wear a long sleeved shirt with either a school dress or skirt. Cardigan, blazer, and scarf are optional. Girls in Cycle 2 or 3 (Grades 6 to 12) wear a long sleeved shirt with a choice of a skirt or two different styles of dress plus a scarf. Cardigan or blazer are optional. These are only for the schools with the Arabic curriculum, not the other schools.

Private schools in the UAE require a school uniform. It can range from a T-shirt or a simple white/black polo bearing the school logo to a more complete uniform with a button up shirt worn with a skirt, shorts or trousers. In the British schools, there is a blouse and either a skirt or trousers for the girls or a button up shirt with trousers. Shirts bear the school logo. Certain schools have certain codes on the use of makeup (some don't condone it at all) and the sporting of bracelets/jewellery.

== United Kingdom ==
While school uniform is common in the United Kingdom, there is no legislation enforcing it in any of the three separate legal jurisdictions of England & Wales, Scotland, and Northern Ireland, and enforcement of school uniform policy and dress codes is generally for individual schools to determine. However, schools do have to take into account equality legislation in dress policies to prevent discrimination on grounds such as age, sex, race, disability, religion or belief and sexual orientation. School uniforms are required to tolerate religious freedoms, e.g. allowing male Sikhs to wear turbans and female Muslims to wear headscarves.

=== England ===
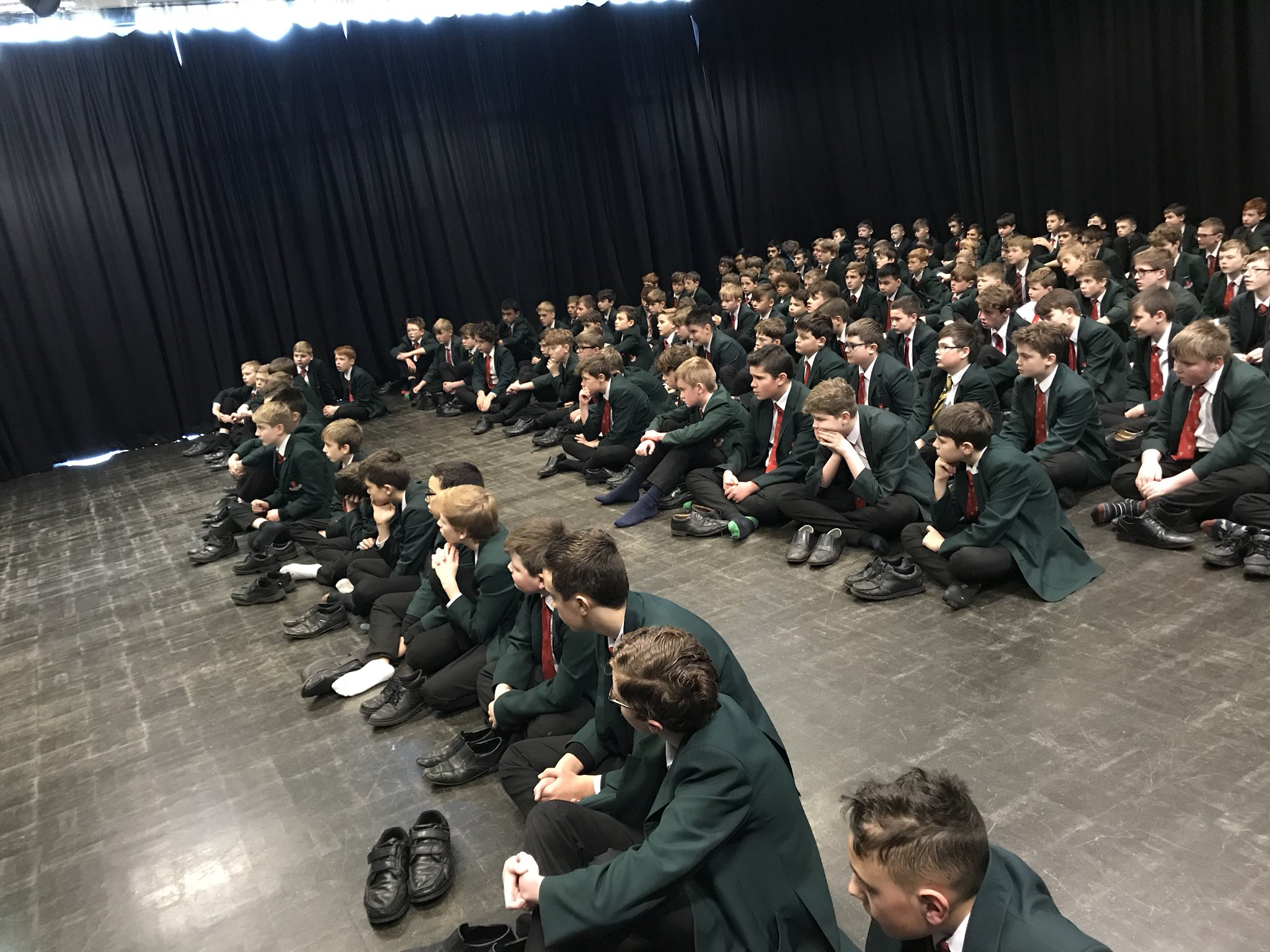
English boys in school uniforms with school shoes removed

In 2011, more than 90% of English secondary schools had a compulsory uniform. School uniforms were first introduced on a large scale during the reign of King Henry VIII. The uniforms of the time were referred as "bluecoats", as they consisted of long trench-coat-style jackets dyed blue. Blue was the cheapest available. The first school to introduce this uniform was Christ's Hospital in London (now in Sussex).

The Elementary Education Act 1870 introduced free primary education for all children. The popularity of uniforms increased, and eventually most schools had a uniform. During this period most uniforms reflected the trends of the age, with boys wearing short trousers and blazers until roughly the age of puberty and then long trousers from about 14 or 15. Girls mainly wore blouses, tunic dress and pinafores.

These uniforms continued until the 1950s when after the Butler reforms secondary education was made free and the school leaving age was raised to 15. These reforms encouraged schools to implement uniform codes that were similar to other schools. Distinct "summer" and "winter" uniforms were sometimes required, particularly for girls, for whom dresses were mandated for summer and gymslips for winter.

In the 21st century, the typical primary school uniform is fairly casual while secondary school uniform is often formal. Uniform in primary school is generally a polo shirt or T-shirt, a jumper with the school logo, and trousers or shorts or a skirt. The typical secondary school uniform is a blazer, white shirt or blouse, a tie, trousers or skirt, and black shoes. Some primary schools have more formal uniform, with tie and blazer, and for secondary schools to require only a jumper. Uniforms sometimes match the school colours, but are most commonly found in blue, black and grey.

=== Scotland ===
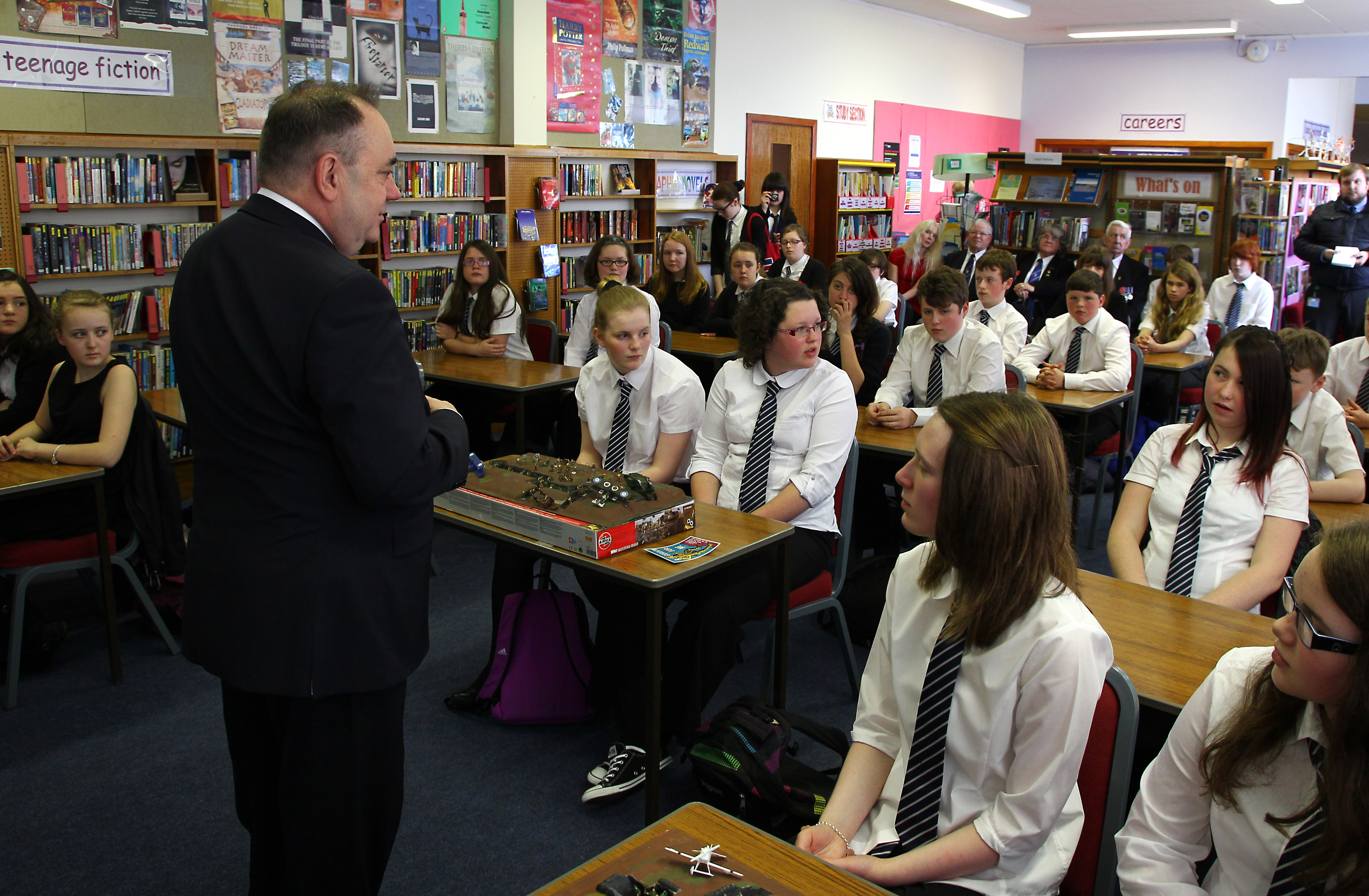
Scottish secondary school pupils in school uniform

Scottish law is not specific on the question of school uniform. Generally, the school must provide information on its policy on clothing and uniform and the Education Authority must provide written information on its general policy on wearing school uniform. Some Education Authorities do not insist on students wearing a uniform as a precondition to attending and taking part in curricular activities.

A child that simply refuses to wear the school uniform can be disciplined by the school if it thinks that academic or disciplinary problems might be caused by the refusal. Punishments include (but are not limited to), isolation, detention or parental contact. Many schools do have a policy covering the wearing of school clothing. The policy may state that certain items must be worn and that other items cannot be worn, for example, jeans. Schools must take religious and cultural requirements into account when drawing up a school uniform policy.

Although the way that the uniforms are worn is usually not an issue, some state schools may have regulation on the subject (e.g. height of ties, whether the shirt is tucked in or not), the selection of clothes worn, whether they follow the policy, can be very strict. For example, in black and white uniform schools, wearing colours such as grey or wearing white shoes is forbidden. However, in schools that only use a basic uniform (e.g. jumper and trousers) the policy is often less strict.

=== Wales ===
The Welsh Assembly Government issued detailed guidance to governing bodies on uniform and appearance policies that begins by making explicit, "There is no education legislation specifically covering the wearing of school uniform or other aspects of appearance such as hair colour and style, and the wearing of jewellery and makeup. However, as part of its responsibility for the conduct of the school, a governing body can specify a uniform that pupils are required to wear and other rules relating to appearance."

=== Northern Ireland ===
The most common secondary school uniform in Northern Ireland is a shirt, blazer and sweater with a tie and a skirt or trousers. The uniform (most likely the sweater and tie) may change after Year 12 (final year of compulsory education). The uniform in primary school is similar to those used in the Republic of Ireland.

== United States ==
Most schools in the United States do not require uniforms. More traditional private schools and other specialized schools sometimes require an informal uniform, called a standardized dress code. Policy regarding school-appropriate dress, and the extent of enforcement, will vary by school and school district. Progressive private schools do not require school uniforms.

Advocacy for school uniforms increased in the 1990s after President Clinton advocated for them.

A study conducted in 2000 found that only 23% of public, private, and sectarian schools had any sort of uniform policy in the United States at or before 2000.

The schools that do require uniforms, or a more common standard dress code in inner city neighborhoods, tend to be more casual than those in Britain or other Commonwealth nations. Commonly, students wear collared, buttoned shirts, with a tie for boys and a tie for girls, worn with khaki trousers, and a belt, depending on the age of the school's student body. Skirts of a modest length are occasionally an option for girls.

Mark Oppenheimer of The New Yorker characterized school uniforms as "relatively new" as they did not have an extensive history there compared to the United Kingdom.

Dress codes vary widely among private schools, although a Catholic school uniform tends to keep the shirt and tie.

The proportion of U.S. public schools requiring uniforms had increased from 3% in 1996 to 25% in 2010. As of 2016, 4% of the public schools with below 25% of the students being allowed to take free or reduced lunch had mandatory uniforms. 53% of the schools with 75% of the students being allowed to take free or reduced lunch had mandatory uniforms. Oppenheimer concluded, based on school uniforms being more common in schools with student bodies from low income backgrounds, that mandatory uniforms "have really become a feature of poor schools." However in 2019 and 2020 due to the COVID 19 pandemic, many districts have removed, changed or relaxed their uniform policies. Most schools with district wide policies rarely enforce the uniform. It is common to see students wearing non-uniform clothes or hoodies over their uniform shirts. Many schools advertise that they require uniforms on their website however on their social media posts, many students are not wearing one.

=== Research studies and legislation ===
According to Oppenheimer, "When independent researchers have tried to quantify [claims that school uniforms are effective], they have had mixed results."

The National Association of Elementary School Principals (NAESP) conducted a phone survey of 755 principals in 2000, which revealed that 21% of public schools had a uniform policy; 23% had firm plans to create one.

Adolfo Santos, a political science professor at the University of Houston–Downtown, stated that many Hispanic communities in the United States choose uniforms because many immigrants originate from countries with schools requiring uniforms.

Sylvan I. Alleyne, Velma LaPoint, Jennifer Lee and Harold W. Mitchell of The Journal of Negro Education stated that little empirical research exists regarding how effective school uniforms are in enhancing academic performance and social environments, and that little research exists regarding teachers' beliefs regarding issues related to dress codes, especially so regarding racial and ethnic minorities. In the United States, literature regarding public school student clothing and behavior cites anecdotal viewpoints from teachers. The literature discussed opinions on faculty, staff, and other employees on how to deal with student dress issues. A 2003 article of The Journal of Negro Education said that research and reports regarding the beneficial impact of school uniforms was not conclusive. Despite the federal government of the United States issuing a set of guidelines encouraging school uniforms in public schools, as of 2003 political support varied.

In 1994, the Long Beach Unified School District, in Southern California, required school uniforms in all elementary and middle schools. However the district no longer requires uniforms anymore. This began a trend for uniforms in American elementary public schools, especially in urban school districts and in low income districts as well. President Clinton praised the idea in his 1996 State of the Union Address, saying that "if it means that teenagers will stop killing each other over designer jackets, then our public schools should be able to require their students to wear school uniforms." Oppenheimer examined the study and argued that "the city had taken many other measures to reduce violence at the same time, so it's hard to tease out how much uniforms mattered."

=== American Samoa ===
All public school students in American Samoa wear school uniforms.

=== Guam ===
Since 2008, Board Policy 401 has made school uniform mandatory in all Guam Department of Education public schools.

=== Northern Mariana Islands ===
In 2009, Hopwood Middle School on Saipan introduced a mandatory school uniform, requiring students to wear blue or gold shirts.

=== Puerto Rico ===
In Puerto Rico, the Department of Education requires all students to wear school uniforms, with only medical exemptions.

=== US Virgin Islands ===
Schools on the United States Virgin Islands require uniforms. Some schools require female students to wear skirts.

== Uruguay ==
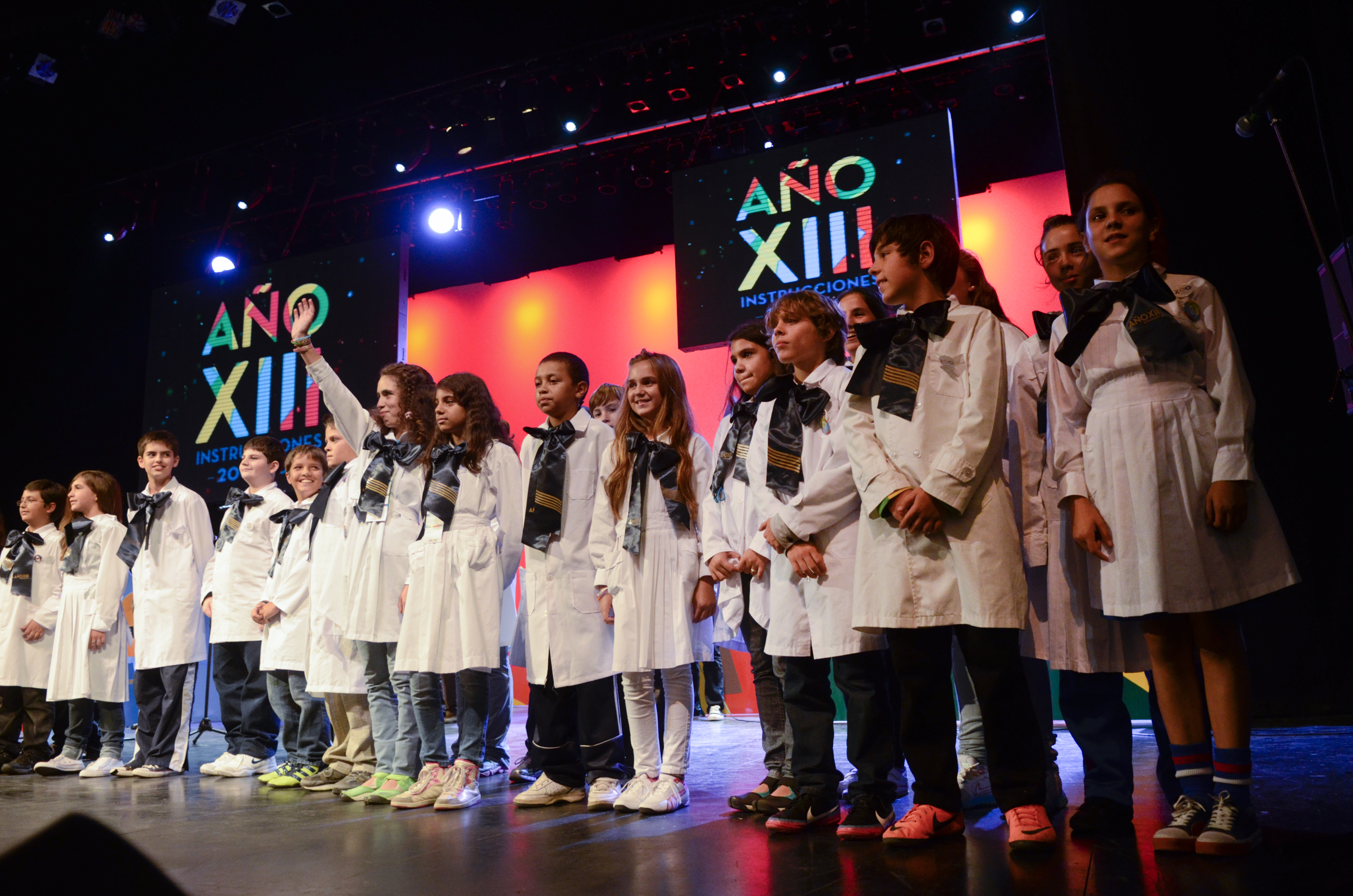
School children in Uruguay

Uniforms are compulsory in all Uruguayan public schools.

The design has been the same since the 1900s, a white coat with a blue ribbon on the neck. It was implemented to promote social equity amongst students of different social backgrounds.

== Uzbekistan ==
In August 2017, President Shavkat Mirziyoyev proposed the introduction of a standardized compulsory uniform across all Uzbek public primary and secondary schools. In August 2018, the Cabinet of Ministers of the Republic of Uzbekistan formally adopted a resolution to enforce the new uniform policy beginning in the 2019/20 school year. In July 2022, Minister of Public Education Baxtiyor Saidov announced the standardized uniform policy will be implemented gradually through 2025.

== Vanuatu ==
School uniforms are widely worn in Ni-Vanuatu schools.

== Vietnam ==
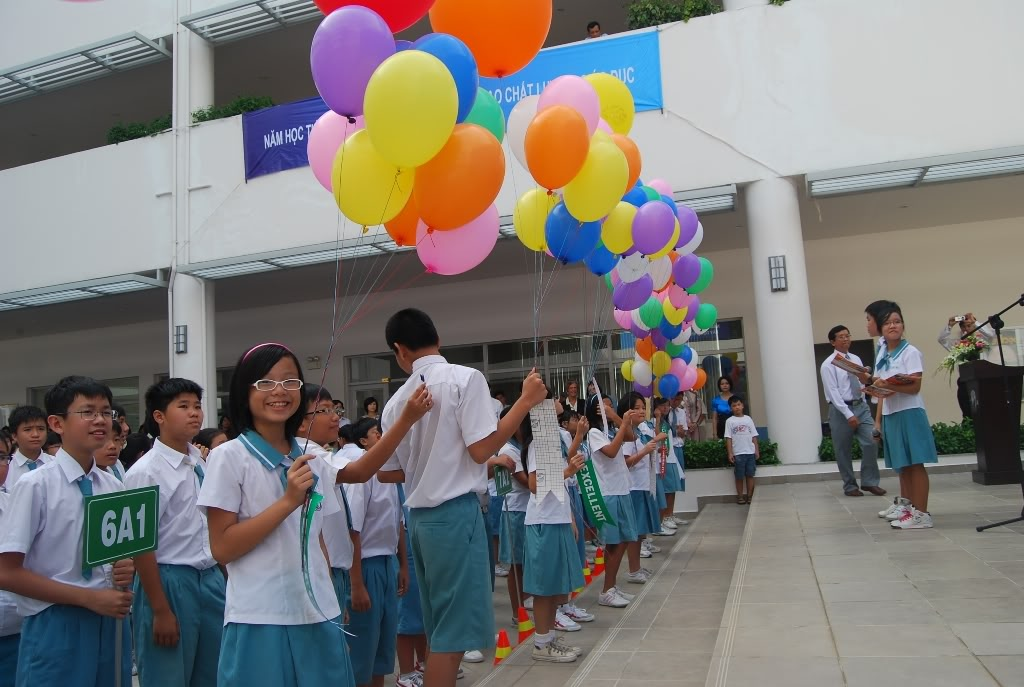
School uniforms of Lawrence S. Ting Memorial School in the 7th District, Ho Chi Minh City

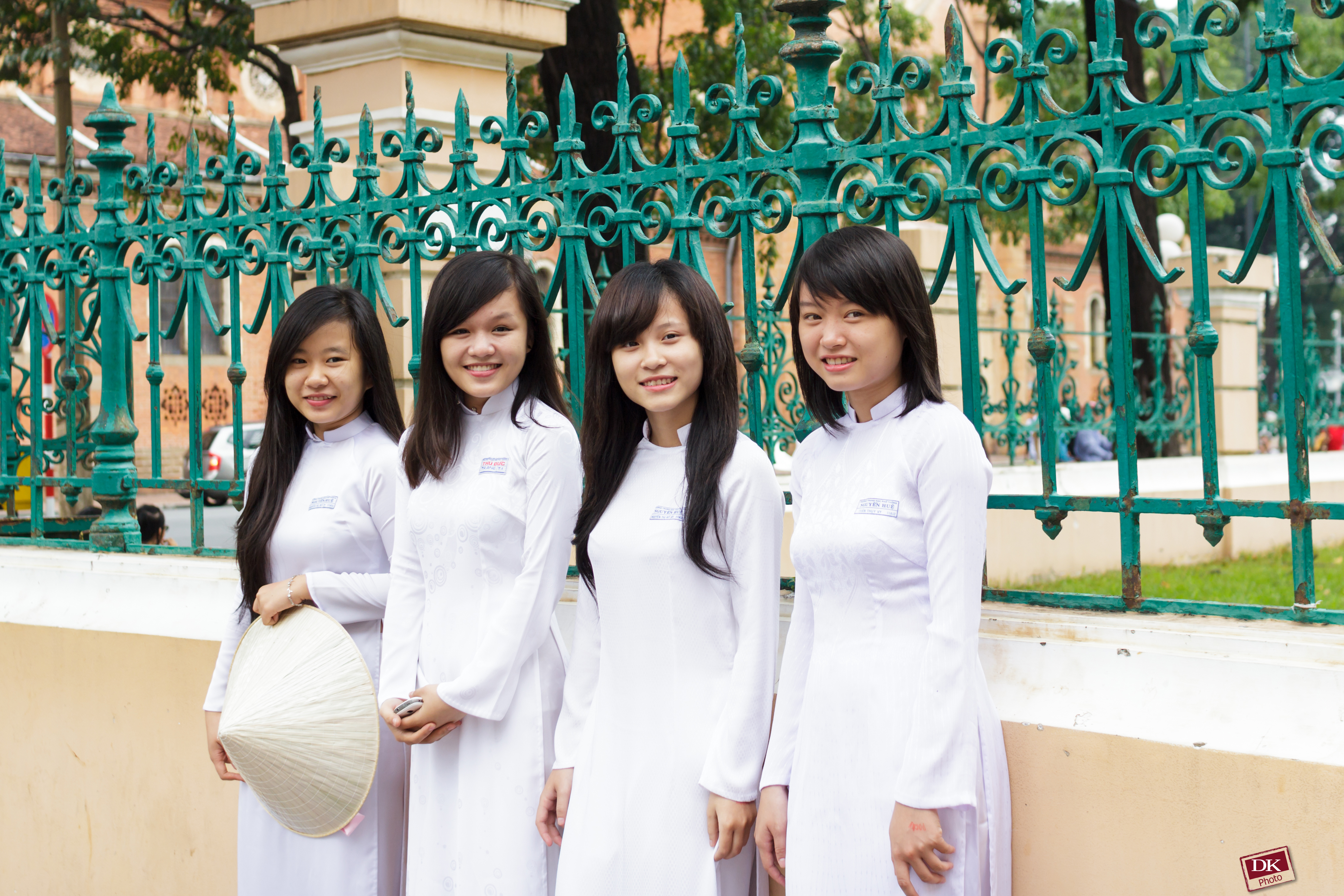
A group of high school girls in white áo dài

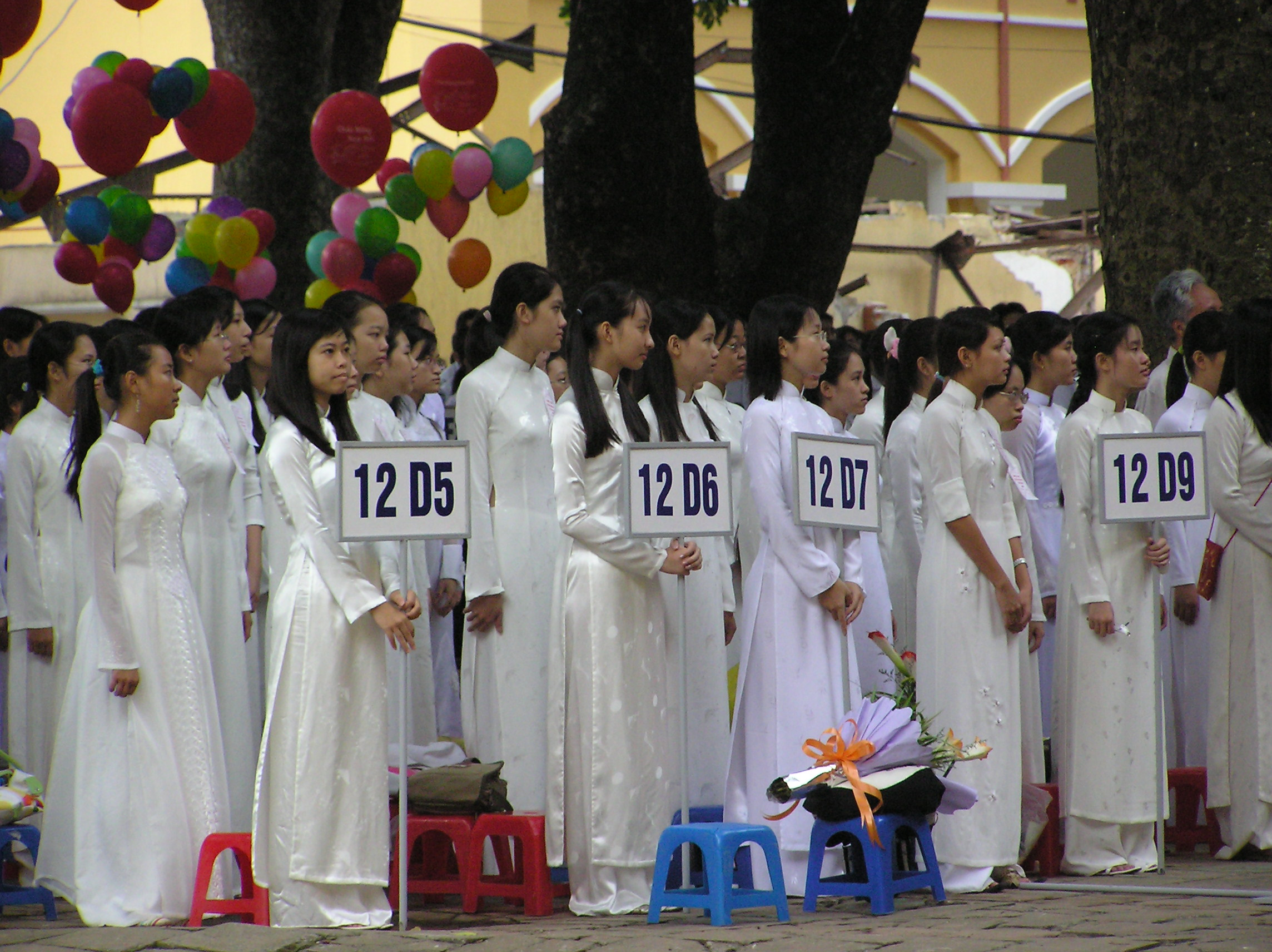

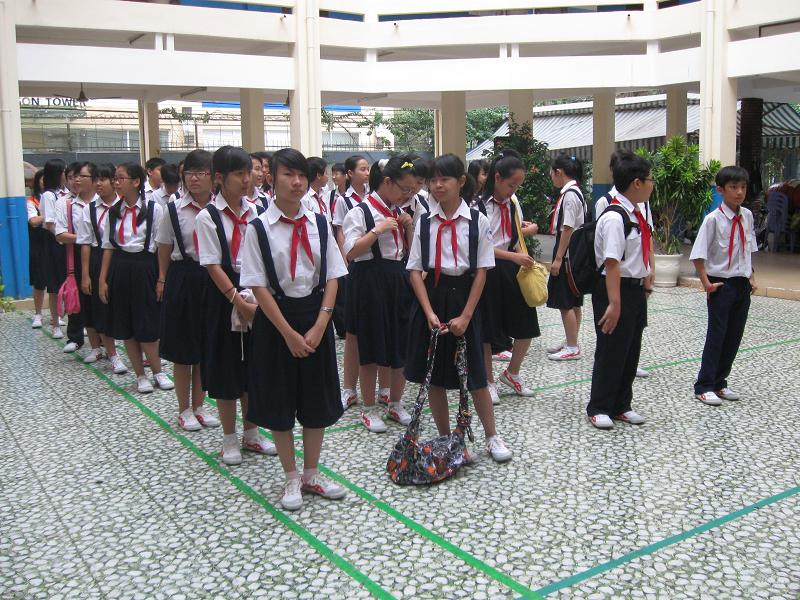

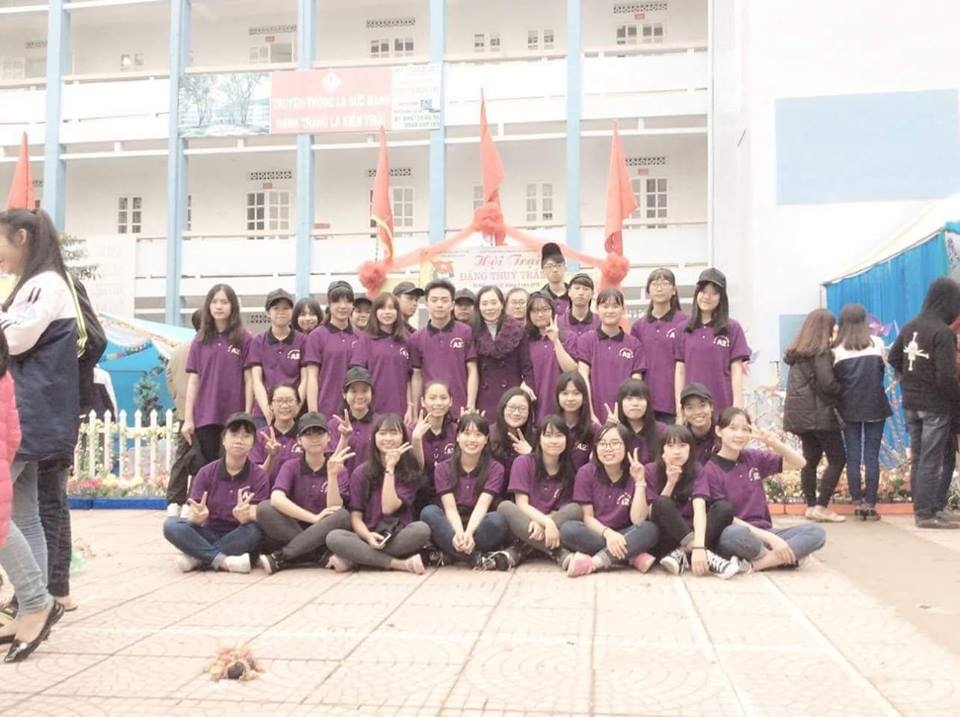

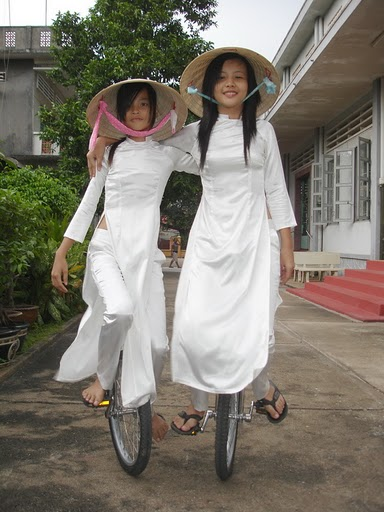

Most schools in Vietnam require uniforms. The rules on uniforms vary between schools and areas. The most common type of uniform consists of a white shirt with the school emblem on the left sleeve and navy/black trousers for boys or skirts for girls, with a red scarf for students from grade 3 to grade 9. Many schools (usually private or famous public schools) have their own designed uniforms, which often include bows, ties or vests/blazers.

The white áo dài, representing the purity and innocence of youth, is used by high school girls in Vietnam, but nowadays, most schools only require it for important events or ceremonies, since wearing áo dài is uncomfortable for daily use. The image of a high school girl with nón lá and white áo dài on a bicycle is considered symbolic.

There are also uniforms for physical education in Vietnamese schools. This usually includes shirts and tracksuits. Both outfits have the school emblem on the chest. The tracksuits are popular in the north, where they are often worn in the winter, even outside of gym activity.

There are no specific shoes for Vietnamese students. However, flip-flops, slippers, and especially high heels are forbidden. Sandals and boots are allowed, although students normally wear sneakers or flats to school. Dyed hair, nail polish and make-up are explicitly banned in virtually all schools.

== Venezuela ==
School uniforms are used in Venezuela. By Venezuelan decree, uniforms are required at all schools in all grades. Boys wear navy trousers and girls wear navy skirts or trousers, depending on the school. The shirts have short sleeves and the colour varies by the level in which the student is. Students in nursery wear yellow shirts, while students in kindergarten wear red shirts. From first to sixth grade, students wear white polo shirts. From seventh to ninth grade they wear light blue polo shirts, and from tenth to eleventh grade they wear beige polo shirts. These shirts are to be stuffed inside the trousers with a black belt. Black dress shoes are the norm in public school, however some private schools can be more flexible with the shoes to be worn.

== Yemen ==
Uniforms are worn in Yemeni schools.

== Zambia ==
School uniforms are ubiquitous across Zambian government and private schools.

== Zimbabwe ==
School uniforms are worn in most Zimbabwean schools, but these policies are not legally mandated.

== See also ==
- Uniform fetishism
