= School uniforms in Myanmar =

School uniforms used in Myanmar

School uniforms in Myanmar, also called the White-Green (Burmese: အဖြူအစိမ်း) is named after the colour code of uniforms of both public school students and teachers in Myanmar. The uniform rule is mandatory, mandated in 1966. Non-state schools and private schools are excluded from the mandate and can have their own uniforms.

The White-Green consists of a white yinbon eingyi (with a green scarf for formal occasions) and green htamein for girls, and a white eingyi (dress shirt) (with taikpon eingyi for formal occasions) and green pahso for boys. It was originally the uniform of Myoma Co-Educational National High School Rangoon.

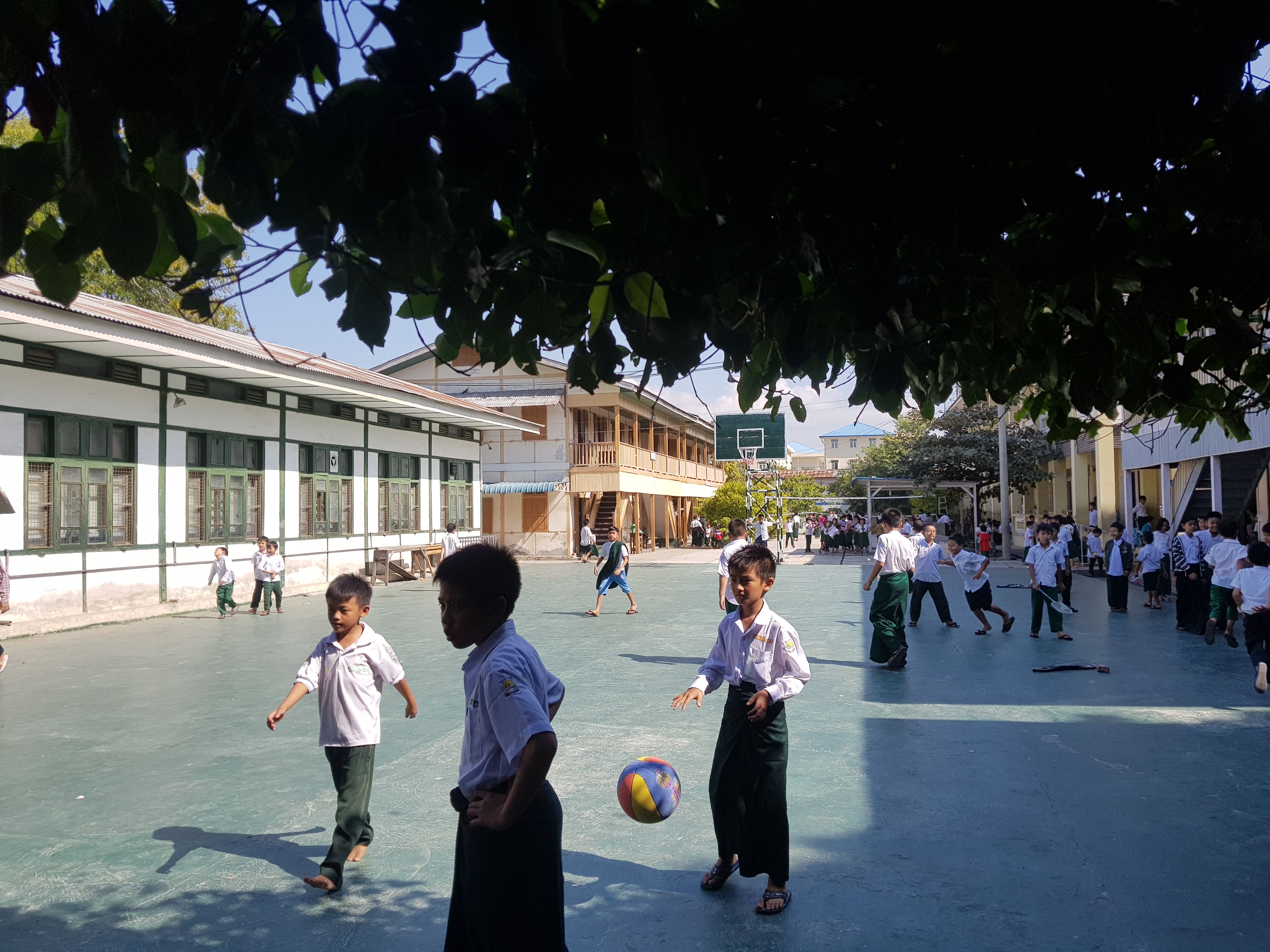
Students at a Basic Education School (public school) in Myanmar.

== History ==
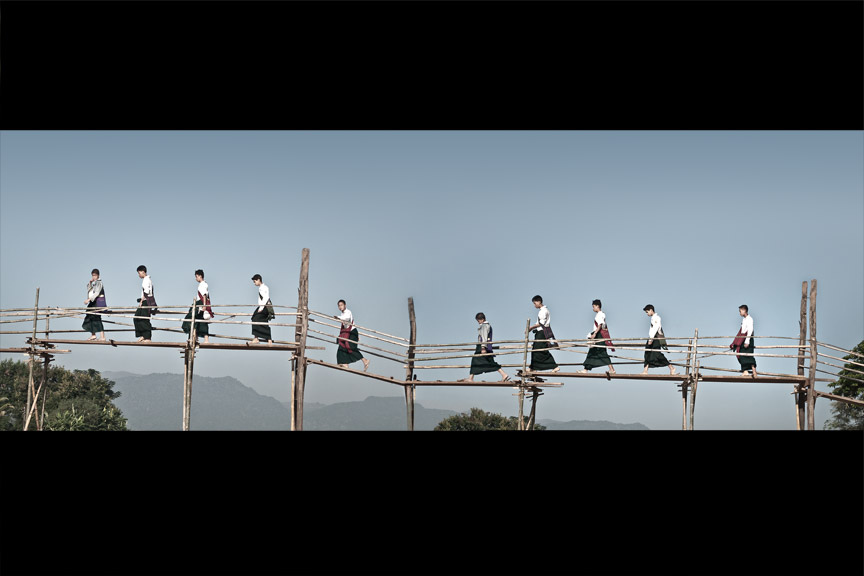
Boys in White-Green uniform going to school.

Before 1966, each school in Burma had its own uniform.

In 1965 and 1966, all non-state schools (private, missionary, national, vernacular, special, etc.) were nationalized and became State Schools. On 14 February 1966, the Revolutionary Government Educational Department mandated all students and teachers in all of Burma to wear the same uniforms.

== Public school uniforms (White-Green) ==
The White-Green Uniforms
Type	Wearer(s)	Male	Female
Primary school students	Students: Kindergarten, 1st Standard, 2nd Standard, 3rd Standard, 4th Standard.	Top: white dress shirt Bottom: green trousers Footwear: shoes or male Burmese sandals	Top: white blouse Bottom: green skirt with or without green pants (There are many variants with mixed designs); Footwear: shoes or female Burmese sandals
Both students and teachers	Students: 5th Standard, 6th Standard, 7th Standard, 8th Standard, 9th Standard, 10th Standard. Teachers: All.	Top: white dress shirt Bottom: green pahso Footwear: male Burmese sandals	Top: white Burmese blouse Bottom: green htamein. Footwear: female Burmese sandals
Typical for teachers Formal for students	Students: All (only for formal wear). Teachers: All	Top: white dress shirt with mandarin collar and (usually white) taikpon Bottom: green pahso Footwear: male Burmese sandals	Top: white Burmese blouse and green scarf Bottom: green htamein Footwear: female Burmese sandals

=== Variations ===
==== White dress shirt ====
Collar:

- With an English collar
- With a mandarin collar (ကော်လံကတုံး)

Sleeves:

- With short sleeves (လက်တို lit. 'short hand')
- With long sleeves (လက်ရှည် lit. 'long hand')

==== White Burmese blouse ====
Opening:

- Buttoned at the front (ရင်စေ့ lit. 'chest closing')
- Buttoned at the side (ရင်ဖုံး lit. 'chest covering')

Sleeves:

- With short sleeves (လက်တို lit. 'short hand')
- With three-quarter sleeves (လက်စက lit. 'middle-sized hand')
- With long sleeves (လက်ရှည် lit. 'long hand')

==== Green colour ====
These are the common variations of green used in school uniforms:

==== Primary school girls' uniform design ====
Primary school student stunt with a special designed uniform in modern day.

The uniform for primary school girls has many variations in designs and styles.

==== Taikpon ====
Common colour variations for taikpon used in schools include:
• White
• Pinni(ပင်နီ)
• Latte

==== Burmese sandals ====
Burmese sandals (lit. 'clip footwear') are the most popular footwear in combination with traditional White-Green uniforms. There are two variations: lacquer and velvet.

Lacquered sandals are usually either black or brown. Velvet sandals vary in colours.

=== Embroidered patches and pin badges ===
==== Embroidered patches ====
Almost all public schools (except TTC Yangon) require that the school's name and badge be embroidered or sewn into the uniform, either on both sleeves or on the left side of the chest (above the pocket for the shirts). Usually, the name of the grades or standards and the class or section are also embroidered or sewn into the uniform on the left side of the chest. Embroidered patches are only on the students' uniforms, not the teachers'.

==== Pin badges ====
An exception is the Practising High School Kamayut (TTC), which does not use embroidered patches. TTC students wear pin badges.

In all public schools, teachers wear a pin badge of the school's badge together with the school's name. Often, they also wear a pin of appointment.

== Uniforms of public universities and colleges ==
Not all universities require uniforms. Uniform rules vary according to each university or college. Many do not require uniforms.

=== Universities, institutes, and colleges that require uniforms ===
Universities of Education (UOEs), Education Colleges (ECs), Education Degree Colleges (EDCs), and Universities for Development of National Races (UDNR) use the traditional White-Green uniforms. Students at these institutions are pre-service trainees to become school teachers.

Universities of Nursing (UONs) use the White-Red uniform of Nursing in Myanmar.

The students' uniforms at Technological Universities (TUs) are white shirts and blue-black pahso for boys, and white blouses and blue-black htamein for girls. Government Technical Institute (GTI) used the same uniforms before 2016, after which their uniform became white shirts and black-blue trousers for both genders.

The uniforms for students of the Universities of Computer Studies (UCSs) are white shirts and blue pahso for boys, and white Burmese blouses and blue htamein for girls.

The uniforms of Myanmar Aerospace Engineering University (MAEU) are white shirts with sky blue neckties and stylepants for boys, and white shirts and khaki skirts for girls.

Students at Myanmar Maritime University (MMU) and Myanmar Mercantile Marine College (MMMC) wear the uniforms of Myanmar seafarers, in addition to a necktie.

=== Universities and colleges that do not require uniforms ===
In 2004, a dress code was imposed for university and college students to wear a white shirt/blouse and longyi (pahso/htamein). T-shirts and jeans were banned.

== Uniforms of private schools, universities, and colleges ==
in 1965 and 1966, the socialist Revolutionary Government nationalized all private schools, which once had their own uniforms. The government made the White-Green the uniform of all schools starting in 1966.

The Ministry of Education of the SPDC Government allowed to open private schools starting in 2010. The new private schools can use either the White-Green uniform or any uniform of their own style.
