= Phawlone =

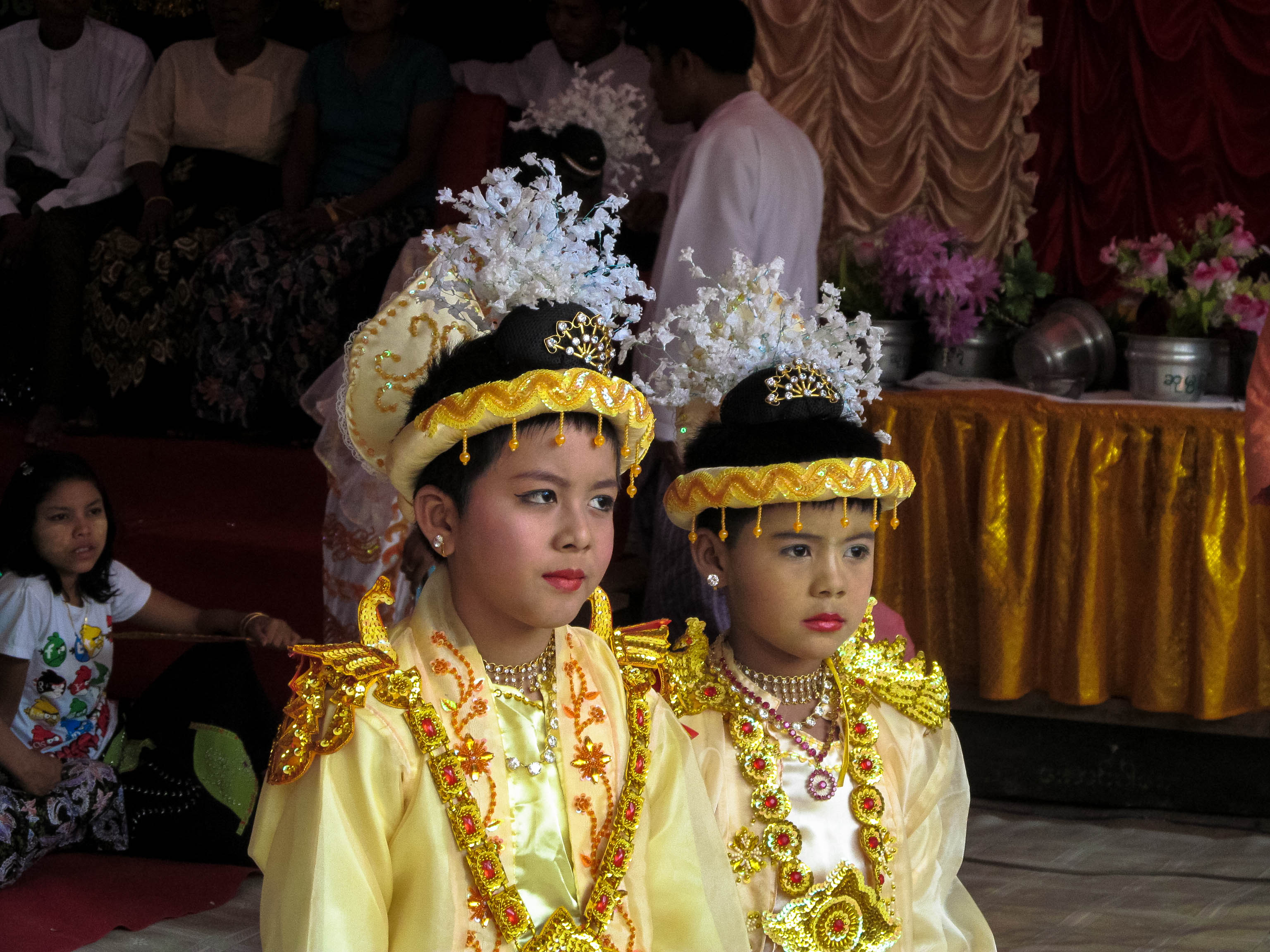
- Burmese boys donning phawlone during their shinbyu ceremony.
- Type: Headgear
- Material: Varies
- Place of origin: Myanmar (Burma)

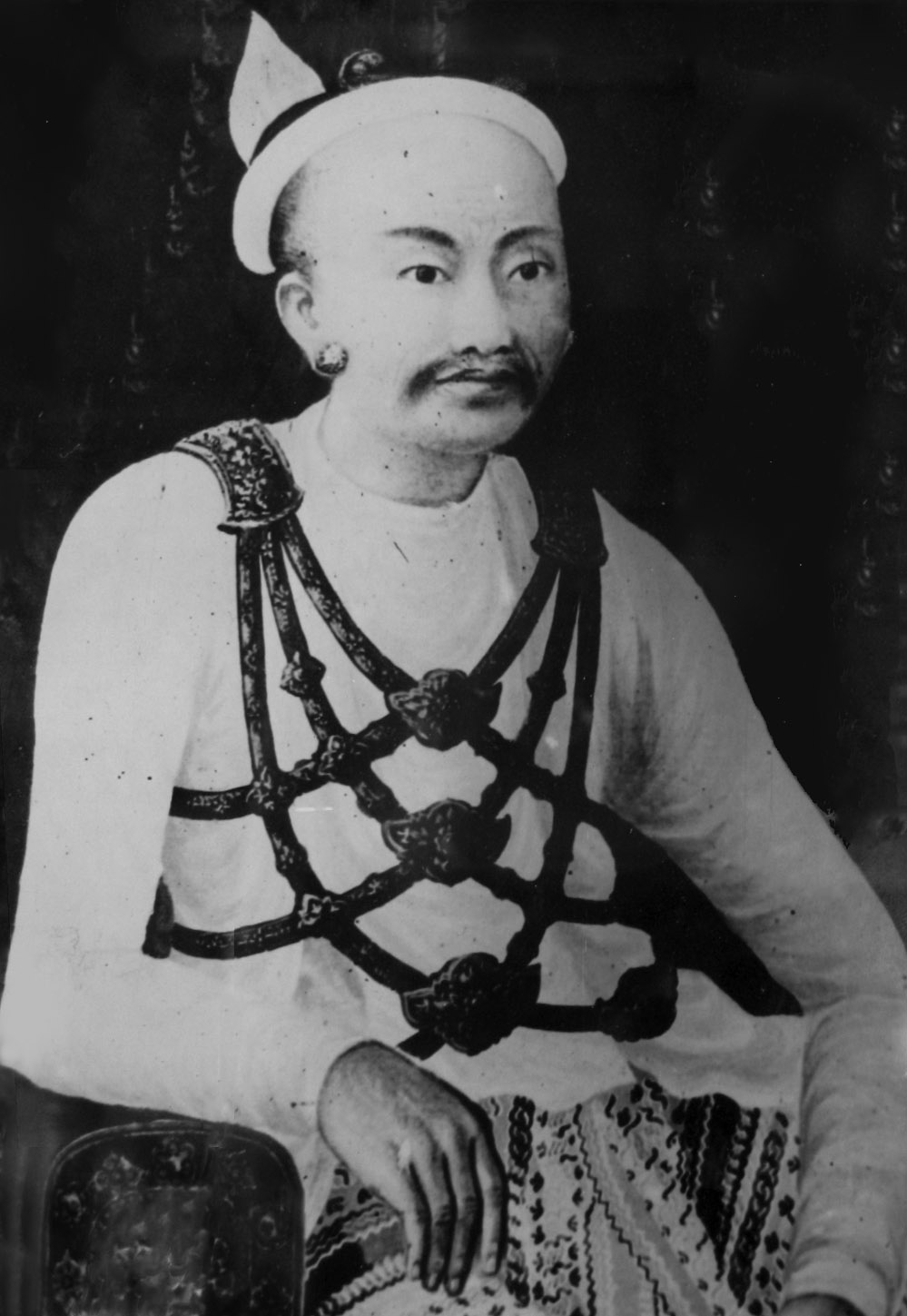
King Mindon Min dressed in a phawlone.

Phawlone (Burmese: ဖော့လုံး, Burmese pronunciation: [pʰɔ̰lóʊɴ]) is an ornamental turban worn by Burmese men, worn as a rolled head band with a leaf-like protrusion at the back. In the pre-colonial era, the phawlone was worn by male members of the Burmese court. In modern-day Myanmar, the phawlone is worn by boys during the shinbyu ceremony, and by Burmese dancers.

== See also ==
- Burmese clothing
- Gaung baung
