= Sibone =

Burmese attire

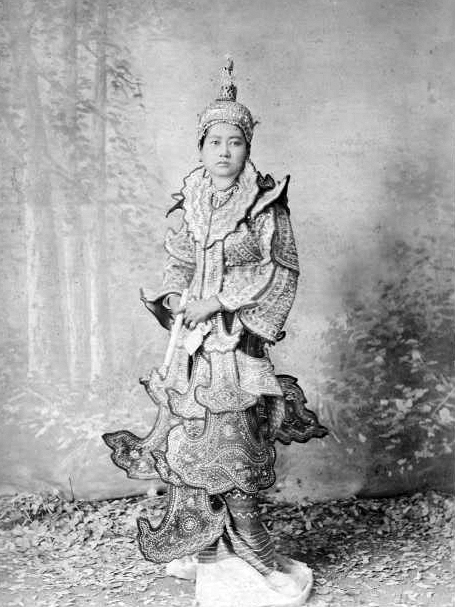
- The royal attire for Burmese queens and princesses featured the sibone and mahālatā.
- Type: Headgear
- Material: Varies
- Place of origin: Myanmar (Burma)

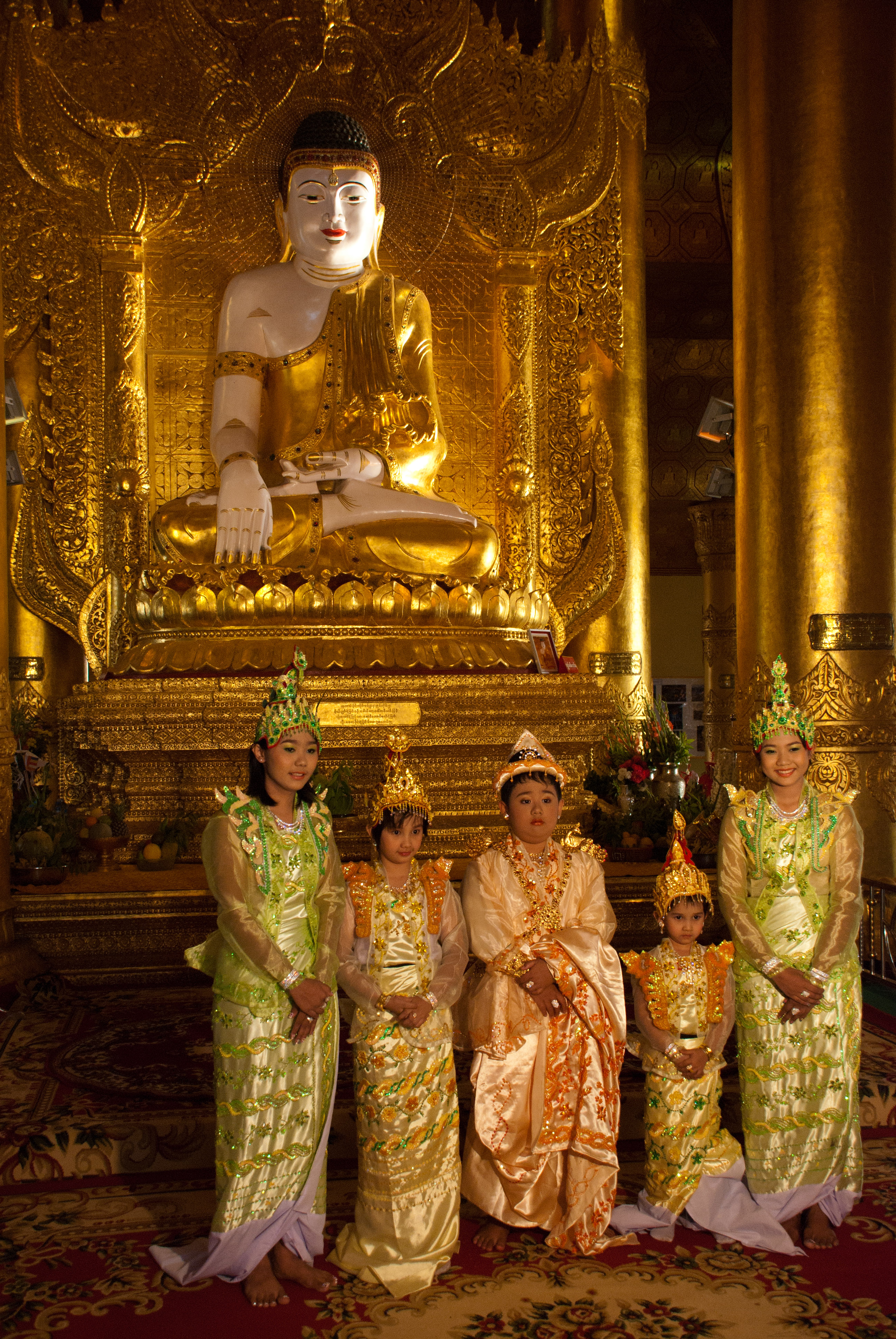
Burmese girls donning sibone during their ear boring ceremony.

Sibone (Burmese: စည်းပုံ, Burmese pronunciation: [síbòʊɴ]) is a ceremonial headdress worn by Burmese women. In the pre-colonial era, the sibone was worn exclusively as royal attire by high-ranking females at the Burmese court, including the queens and princesses. The sibone, along with the mahālatā, formed the ceremonial dress for Burmese state functions. In modern-day Myanmar, the sibone is worn by girls during the ear piercing ceremony, and by Burmese dancers.

== See also ==
- Burmese clothing
