= Pinni (disambiguation) =

Pinni may also refer to:

- Pinni North Indian cuisine dish that is eaten mostly in winters.
- Pinni (cloth) a handwoven cotton goods of Burma.
- Pinni (film) a 2020 Indian Hindi-language family drama film.
