= Burmese clothing =

Types and social use of clothing in Myanmar

Clothing in Myanmar varies depending on the ethnicity, geography, climate and cultural traditions of the people of each region of Myanmar (Burma). The most widely recognized Burmese national costume is the longyi, which is worn by both males and females nationwide. Burmese clothing also features great diversity in terms of textiles, weaves, fibers, colours and materials, including velvet, silk, lace, muslin, and cotton.

== History ==
=== Pre-colonial era ===
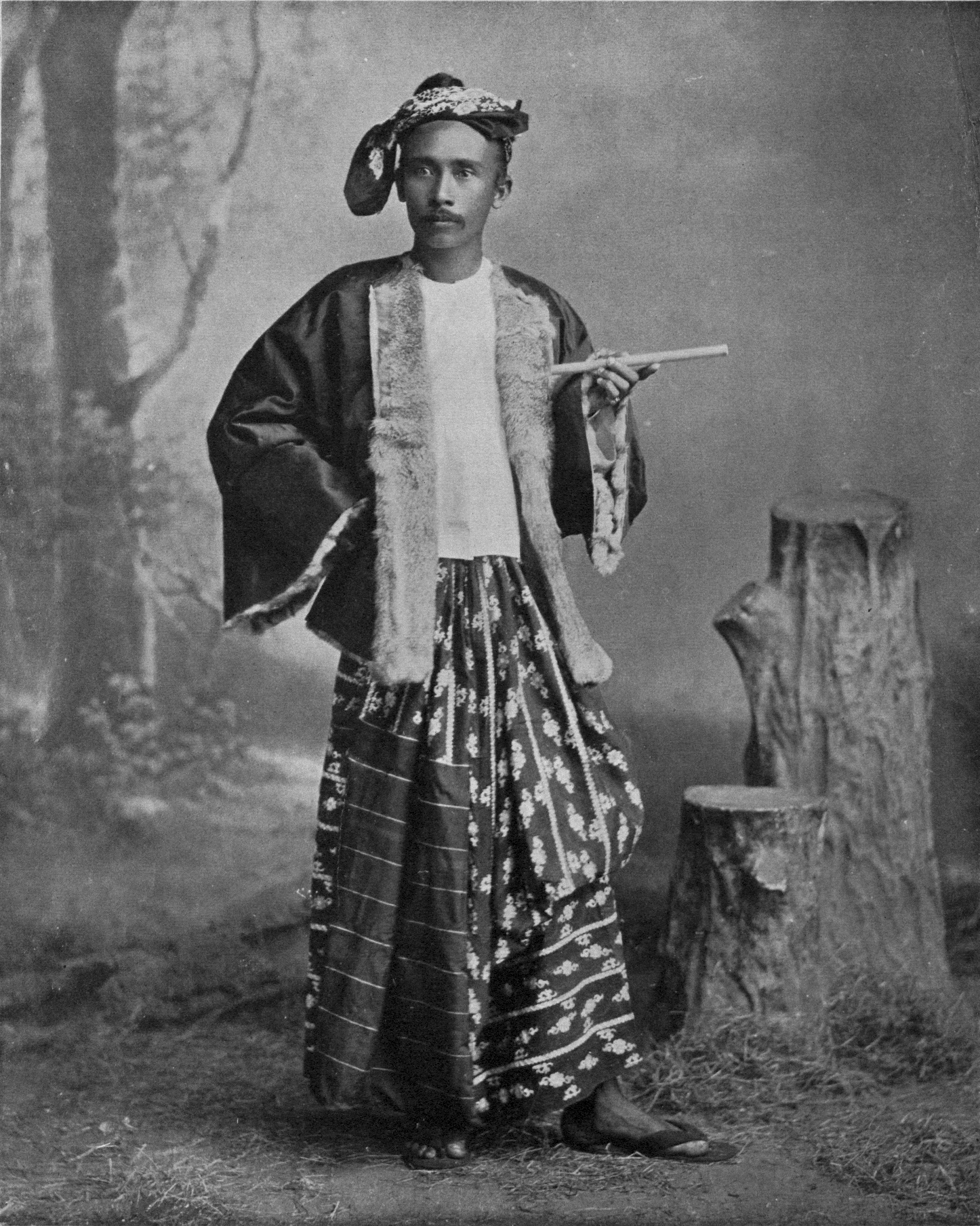
A Burmese man photographed in 1895 wearing a turban and silk taungshay paso.

==== Hanlin ====
At the ancient city of Hanlin, the discovered Pyu sculptures depict Pyu men wearing headwarps and crown-like headdresses, while Pyu women are shown with head ornaments similar to the golden headdresses later seen in the Bagan period. Although images of ear ornaments and Pyu figures are relatively rare on these stone carvings, the wide, drooping earlobes suggest that wearing ear plugs or earrings was likely a common practice. Jewelry and accessories were not as abundant as in the later Bagan period, but large bead necklaces were found adorning the necks of both Pyu men and women. Clear representations of shirts and waist-wrapped skirts are not distinctly visible. The fabric appears so thin that it seems to cling closely to the body.

==== Sri Ksetra ====
Sri Ksetra or Thaye Khittaya (Burmese: သရေခေတ္တရာ; lit., "Field of Fortune" or "Field of Glory"), located 8 km (5.0 mi) southeast of Prome (Pyay) at present-day Hmawza village, was the last and southernmost Pyu capital.

Sarong-like skirts are depicted more clearly in the Sri Ksetra's Pyu sculptures. Some images of Pyu women show them wearing extremely thin, form-fitting skirts that highlight their figures, while others display thicker, more structured skirts. For Pyu men, their attire also resembles the baggy trousers seen in the later Bagan period, tied at the waist with a belt, often knotted in a style similar to that of the Bagan people. Additionally, some male figures appear to wear a draped cloth resembling a shirt, though faint and subtle. Pyu men are also shown adorned with bracelets and large ear ornaments. Hairstyles for both men and women appear quite similar, with their hair gathered at the crown and secured by some kind of hairpiece, often styled into prominent topknots or buns.

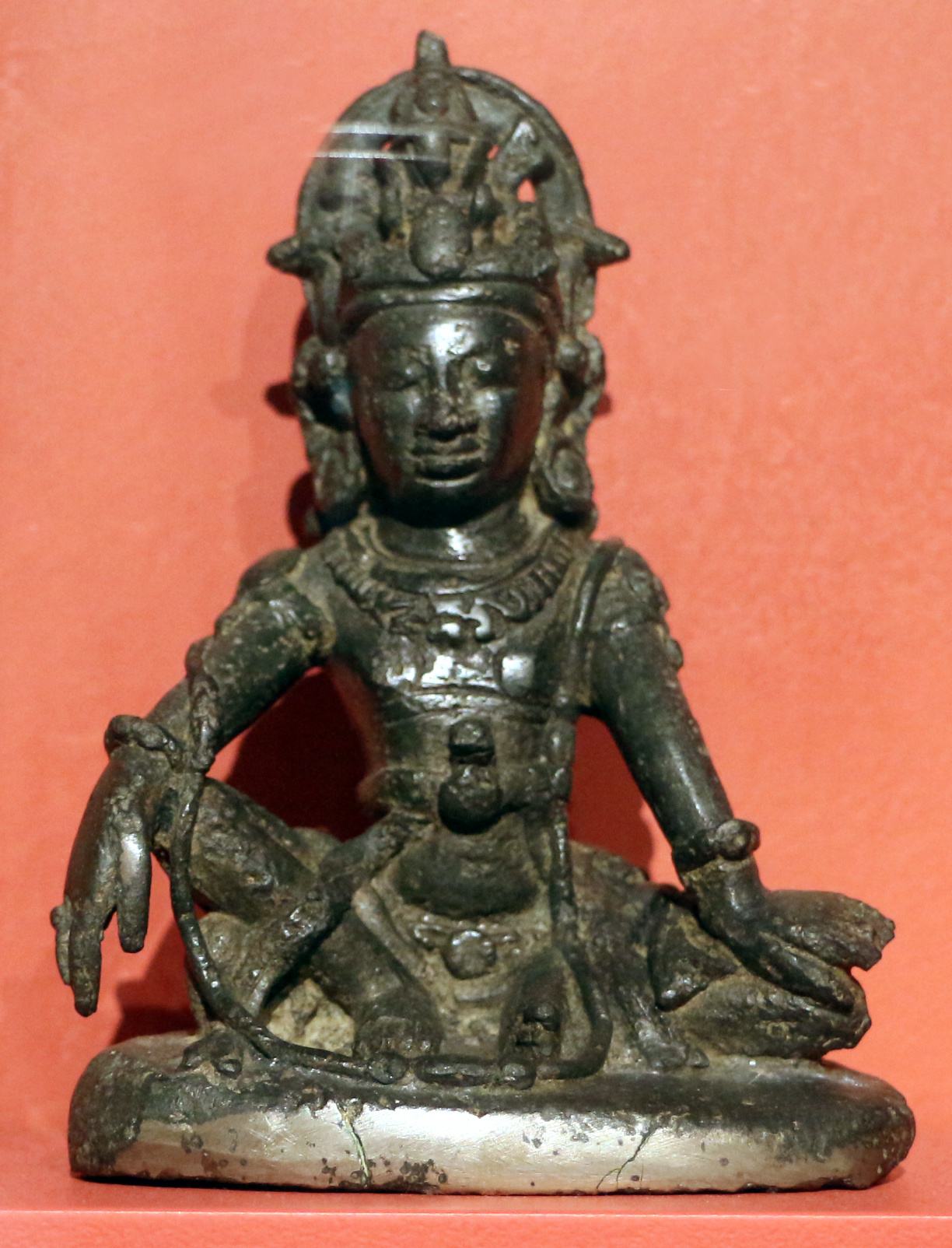
Maitreya the Bodhisattva in Pyu art

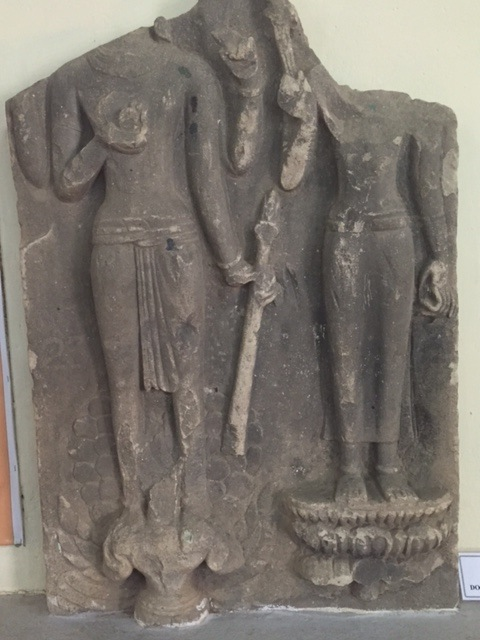
Statue of Vishnu and Lakshmi.

Notably, the hairstyles of Pyu women align with descriptions found in Chinese historical records. These records mention that "after marriage, Pyu women would wrap their hair into a bun on top of their heads, adorned with silver or pearl ornaments." According to Chinese record, the Pyu primarily wore cotton garments. They refrained from wearing silk, as harvesting silk required killing silkworms, which they believed contradicted their value of non-violence. The records also describe Pyu women wearing crown decorated with golden floral patterns and pearl-inlaid designs.

In terms of clothing, Pyu women dressed in vibrantly colored warped skirts, often layering a delicate silk shawl over their shoulders. When venturing outside, they commonly carried hand fans. It is even noted that high-ranking women were often accompanied by four or five attendants carrying fans as part of their entourage.

==== Pagan era ====
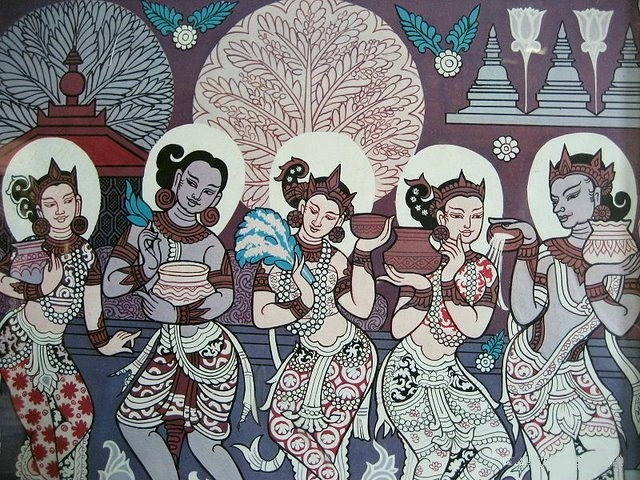
An illustration depicting Pagan-era clothing.

During the Pagan dynasty, while cotton was the most commonly used textile material, other imported textiles such as silk, satin, and velvet, were also used in Burmese clothing. Trade with neighboring societies has been dated to the Pyu era, and certainly enriched the material culture, with imported textiles used for ritual and costume. For instance, the Mingalazedi Pagoda, built during the reign of Narathihapate, contains enshrined articles of satin and velvet clothing, which were not locally produced.

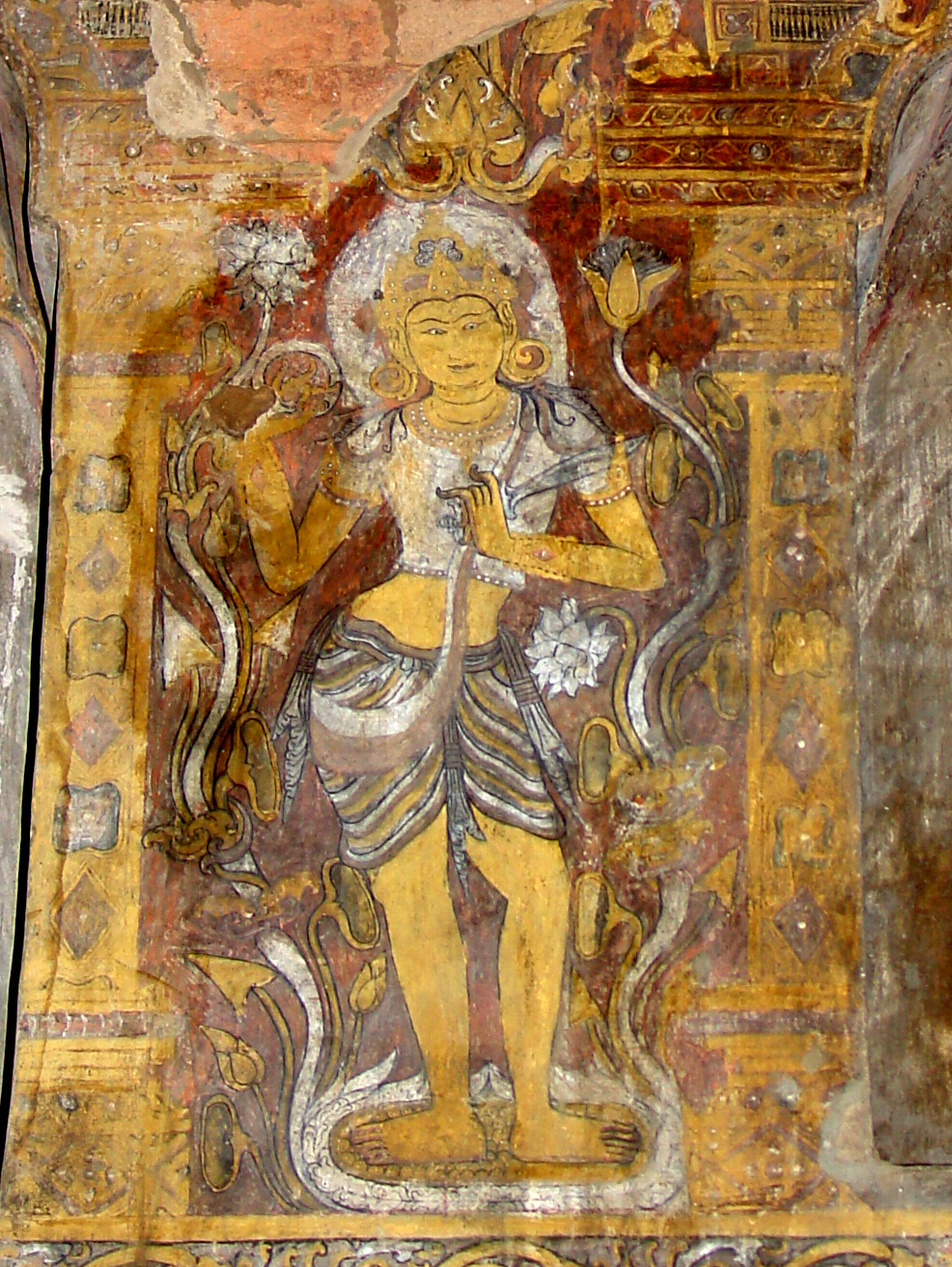
11th century painting of Bodhisattva in Abeyadana Temple, Pagan. In this painting, he wears a short-waisted body cloth and a dhoti-like paso(ပဆိုဝ်)/ kase(ခဆီး).

Pagan-era kings and princes wore robes called wutlon (ဝတ်လုံ), duyin (ဒုယင်), and thoyin (သိုရင်း) as upper garments, while wearing dhoti-like loinclothes as lower garments. Meanwhile, aristocratic women wore strapless bodices called yinsi (ရင်စီး) over a chemise, before adopting looser jackets and body garments, including longer sari-like garments and baggy trousers, that gained currency in the later Pagan period. Relative social rank was distinguished by the use of gold and silver embroidery patterns; high quality attire and floral designs were worn by the upper class and ruling class.

==== First Inwa era ====
The traditional attire of the Inwa period is more frequently referenced in literary works such as poems and classical writings than in paintings or sculptures. According to a Chinese record dated 1396 AD, the people of Inwa (Ava) wore white bell-sleeved long shirts. Their waistcloths were wrapped from the front to the back and tied securely around the waist. It was noted that the paso (sarong) worn by noblemen was about 20 feet long, while those of commoners measured around 10 feet.

Men adorned themselves with patterned cloths wrapped around their heads, with the remaining part of the cloth trailing down the back. They wore one side of their shirt draped over a shoulder, leaving part of their upper body exposed. Women, on the other hand, covered themselves with a white shawl draped over their bodies and used patterned cloths to wrap around their necks, akin to a scarf. These records reflect the clothing styles of the people of Inwa during the reign of King Swa Saw Ke. Based on these accounts, it can be said that men in the Inwa period typically wore white bell-sleeved long shirts, taungshay paso, and head wraps (gaung baung).

According to Shin Maha Ratthathara's Pu-ray-ni-tin Yadu (ပုရေနိသင်ရတု), it is noted that Hsin-Swel-Wun-Syet (ဆင်စွယ်ဝန်းယှက်) textile patterns existed in the waving world at the time. However, these wave-like patterns were not yet referred to as "Acheik (အချိတ်)." Furthermore, in his Taung-te-tount Yadu (တောင့်တဲတွန့်ရတု), Shin Maha Ratthathara described the traditional attire and styles for women of the era, highlighting the preservation of ancient fashion. He mentioned the Myeik Phyu (မြိတ်ဖြူ), Myeik Soh (မြိတ်စို့), and Myeik Lok (မြိတ်လွတ်) hairstyles. Women were adorned in fragrant gold blouses and gold htameins (sarongs), accessorized with intricately crafted golden earrings. Their fingertips were dyed red with henna, their natural long eyelashes enhanced, and their eyebrows meticulously drawn with a brush. Their faces were delicately layered with fragrant traditional makeup (Kato Thaw Maw), creating an appearance so elegant and divine that they were compared to celestial maidens from the six abodes of the heavenly realm. Additionally, the Kyet-Taung-Zi (ကြက်တောင်စည်း) hairstyle — where the hair was gathered at the top of head and secured — was also described.

When portraying the beauty of an Inwa maiden, Shin Maha Ratthathara’s depiction was strikingly tender and graceful, offering a perspective unlike that of others. He captured a particular moment — the twilight hour — when her beauty became even more enchanting. His verses did not merely highlight her golden bun, blouse (eingyi), sarong (htamain), and belt but also subtly hinted at the delicate way her clothing seemed to reveal and conceal her chest, adding a bold yet artistic flair to his poetry.

==== Konbaung era ====
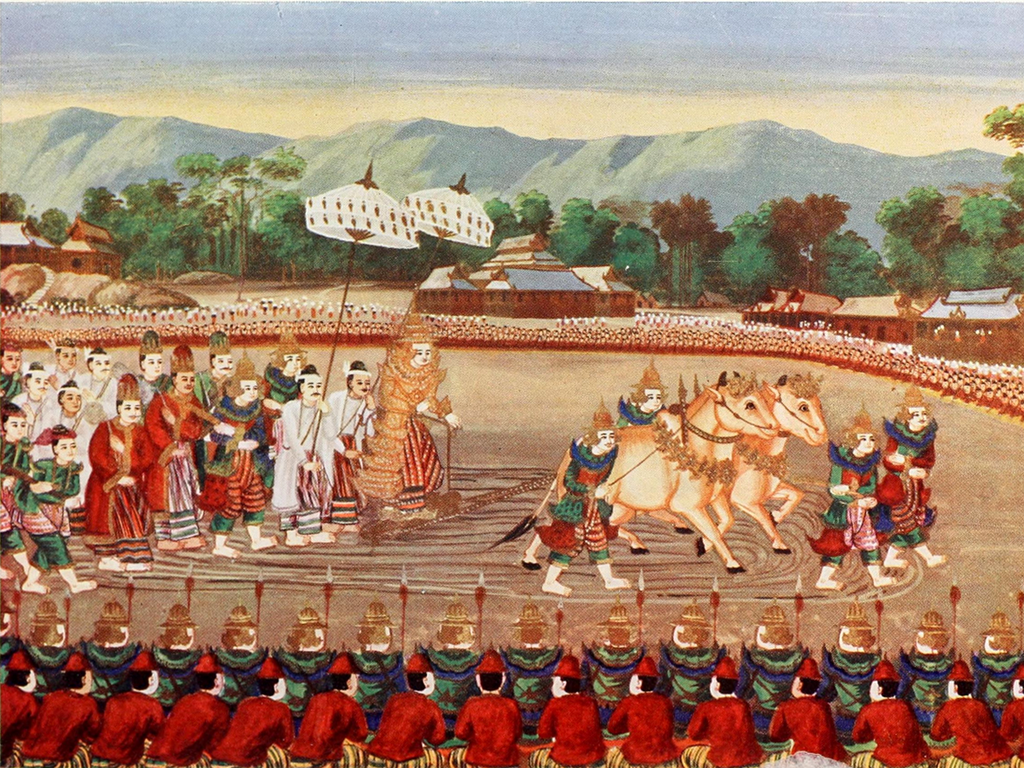
Burmese courtiers and the monarch dressed in royal ceremonial costumes during a Royal Ploughing Ceremony.

Dress was a major cultural aspect of life in pre-colonial Burmese kingdoms. Foreign travelers reported the presence of a loom in every household, enabling every women to weave their family's everyday clothing. Vincenzo Sangermano, an Italian priest who was posted in the Konbaung kingdom at the turn of the 19th century, observed that locals were "splendid and extravagant in their dress." Ear-boring ceremonies for girls was a major rite of passage. Locals adorned themselves with gold and silver, including rings set with precious stones, necklaces, bracelets, and anklets. These accessories accompanied traditional attire, consisting of a sarong-like wrap – paso for men or a htamein for women – both of which were made of cotton or silk. Wooden or leather sandals were worn as footwear. Men and women alike dressed in their finest attire, including ornamented jackets, for visits to pagodas and other important events.

Sumptuary laws called yazagaing dictated material consumption for Burmese subjects in the Konbaung kingdom, everything from the style of one's house to clothing appropriate for one's social standing, from regulations concerning funerary ceremonies and the coffin to be used to usage of various speech forms based on rank and social status. In particular, sumptuary laws in the royal capital were exceedingly strict and the most elaborate in character. Sumptuary regulations governing dress and ornamentation were carefully observed as a means of reinforcing social hierarchy.

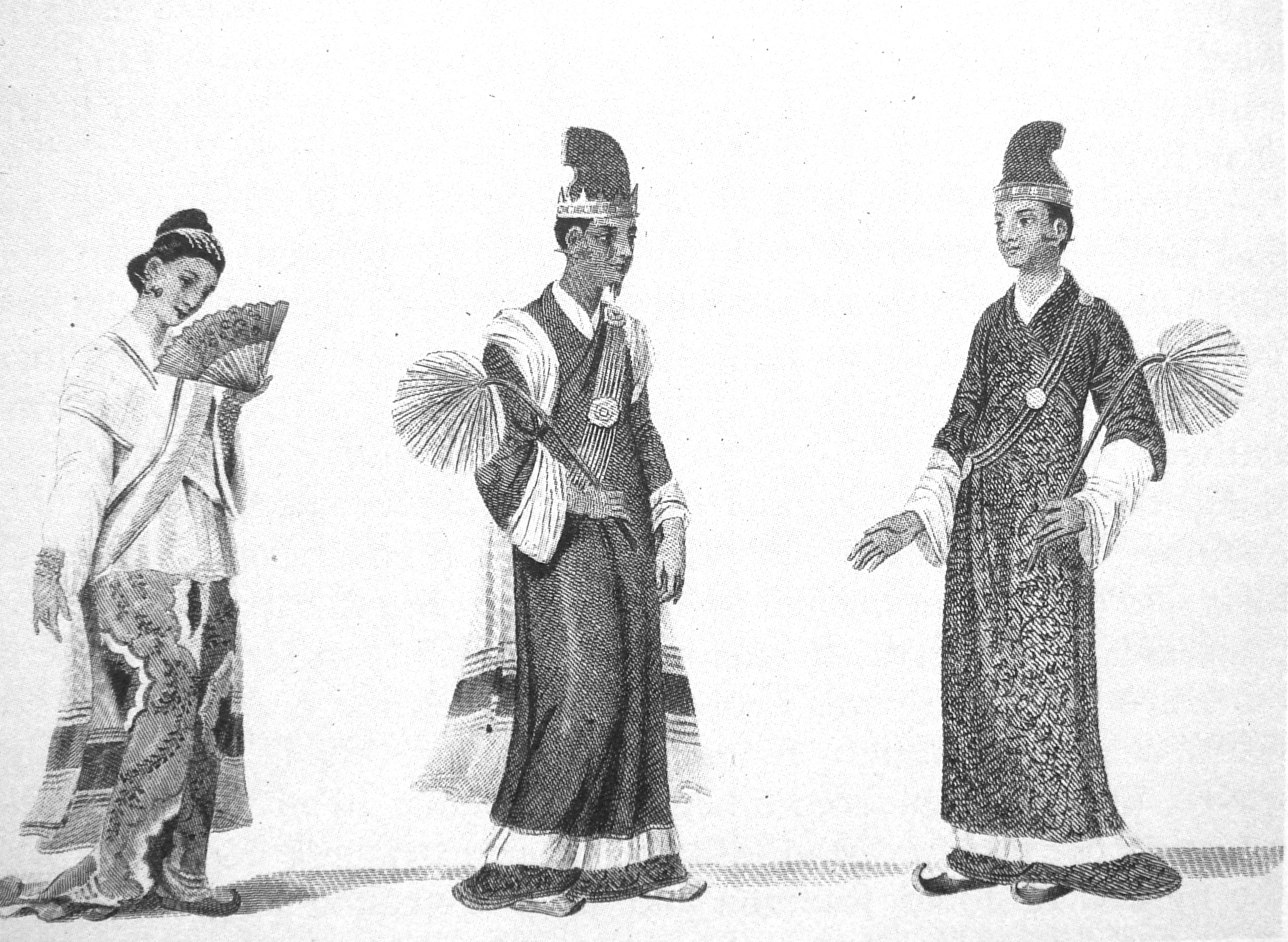
An Attawoon, or Minister of the Interior, and his Wife (left). A Seredogee, or Secretary of State (right). In their dress of ceremony. (1795 CE)

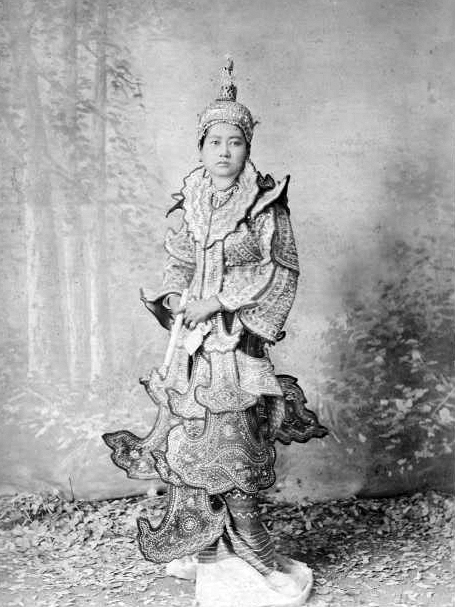
Konbaung royal dress (1889 CE)

Designs with the peacock insignia were strictly reserved for the royal family and long-tailed hip-length htaingmathein jackets and surcoats were reserved for officials. Fabrics with metallic threads, sequins and embroidery were limited to royals, high-ranking officials, and tributary princes (sawbwa). Velvet sandals were only permitted to be worn by members of the royal family and ministers’ wives. Adornment with jewels and precious stones was similarly regulated. Usage of hinthapada (ဟင်္သပဒါး), a vermilion dye made from cinnabar, was also regulated.

=== Colonial era ===
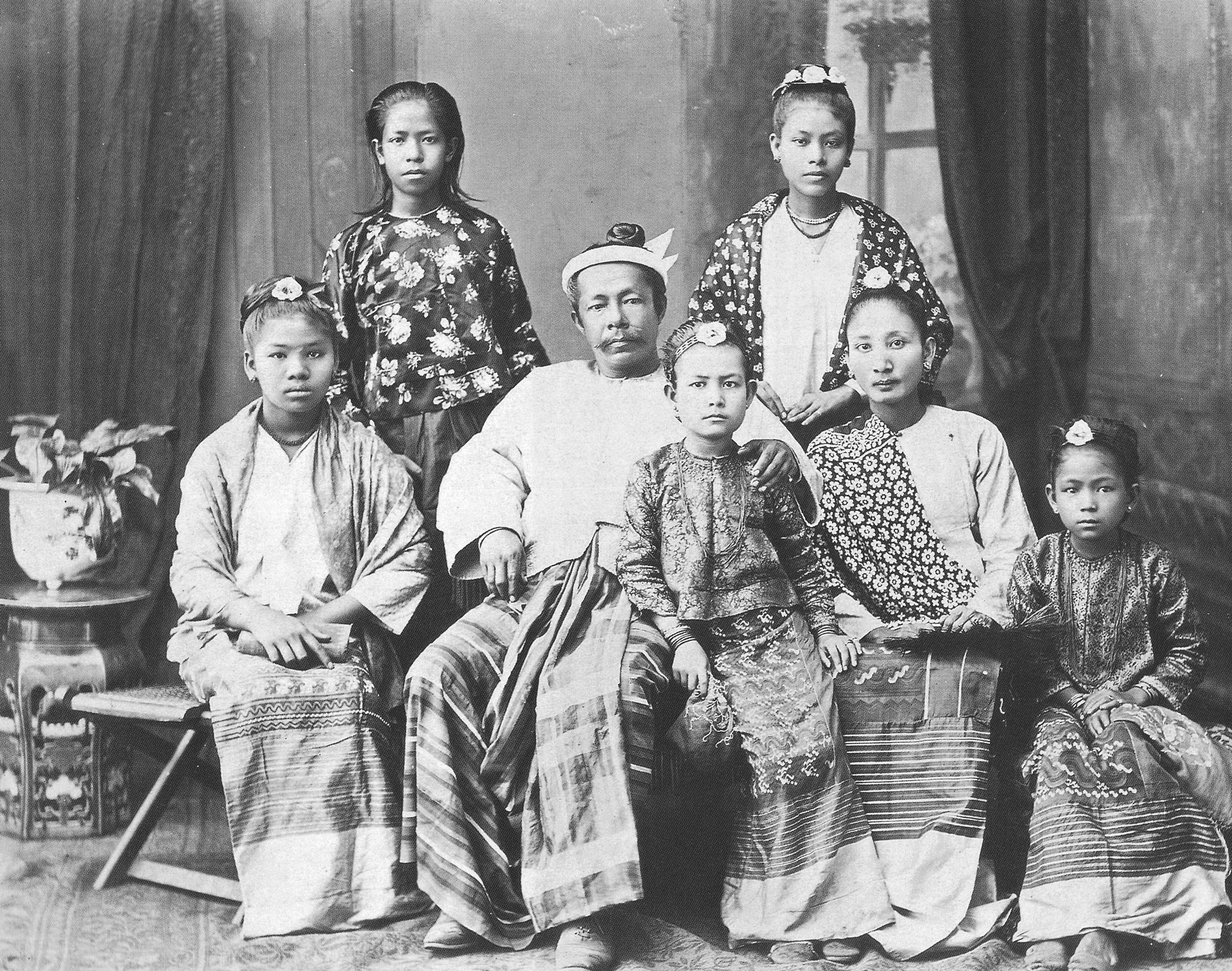
Portrait of a Burmese family dressed in traditional attire at the turn of the 20th century.

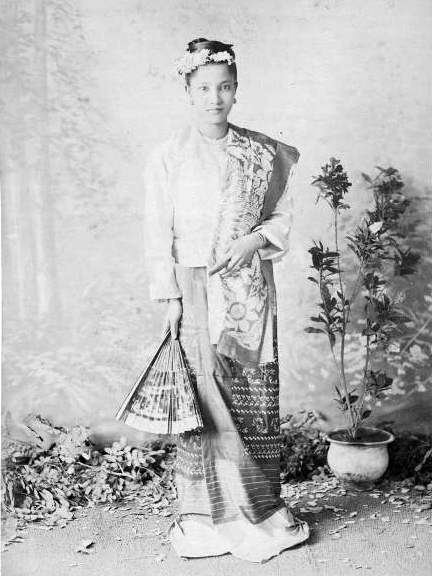
A Mandalay woman dressed in a trailing htamein commonly worn in until the early 20th century.

The dawn of colonial rule led to the demise of sumptuary laws. Unlike in neighboring French Indochina, the Burmese monarchy was completely dismantled, creating an immediate vacuum for state sponsorship of material culture, institutions, and traditions. The colonial era ushered in a wave of non-aristocratic nouveau riche Burmese who sought to adopt the styles and costumes of the aristocrats of pre-colonial times.

During the British colonial era, clothing gained new meaning in Burmese life, as an expression of anti-colonial sentiment. Burmese nationalists associated traditional clothing, in particular Yaw longyi (ယောလုံချည်), a type of longyi from the Yaw region, and pinni taikpon (ပင်နီတိုက်ပုံအင်္ကျီ), a fawn-coloured collarless jacket, with anti-colonialism and nationalist sentiment; Burmese who wore this characteristic outfit were arrested by British police. The wearing of "traditional" clothing was now seen as a mode of passive anti-colonial resistance among the Burmese. Inspired by Gandhi's Swadeshi movement, Burmese nationalists also waged campaigns boycotting imported goods, including clothing, to promote the consumption of locally produced garments.

Clothing styles also evolved during the colonial era; the voluminous taungshay paso and htamein with its train, were abandoned in favor of a simpler longyi that was more convenient to wear. The female sarong (htamein) became shorter, no longer extending to the feet, but to the ankles, and the length of the sarong's topband decreased to reveal more waistline. This period also saw the introduction of a sheer muslin blouse for women, revealing a corset-like lace bodice called za bawli (ဇာဘော်လီ). British rule also influenced hair fashion and clothing. Western accessories such as belts and leather shoes were commonly worn with "traditional" attire. Cropped short hair, called bo ke (ဗိုလ်ကေ) replaced long hair as the norm among Burmese men. Similarly, women began wearing hairstyles like amauk (အမောက်), consisting of crested bangs curled at the top, with the traditional hair bun (ဆံထုံး). The practice of traditional Burmese tattooing similarly declined in popularity.

=== Modern era ===
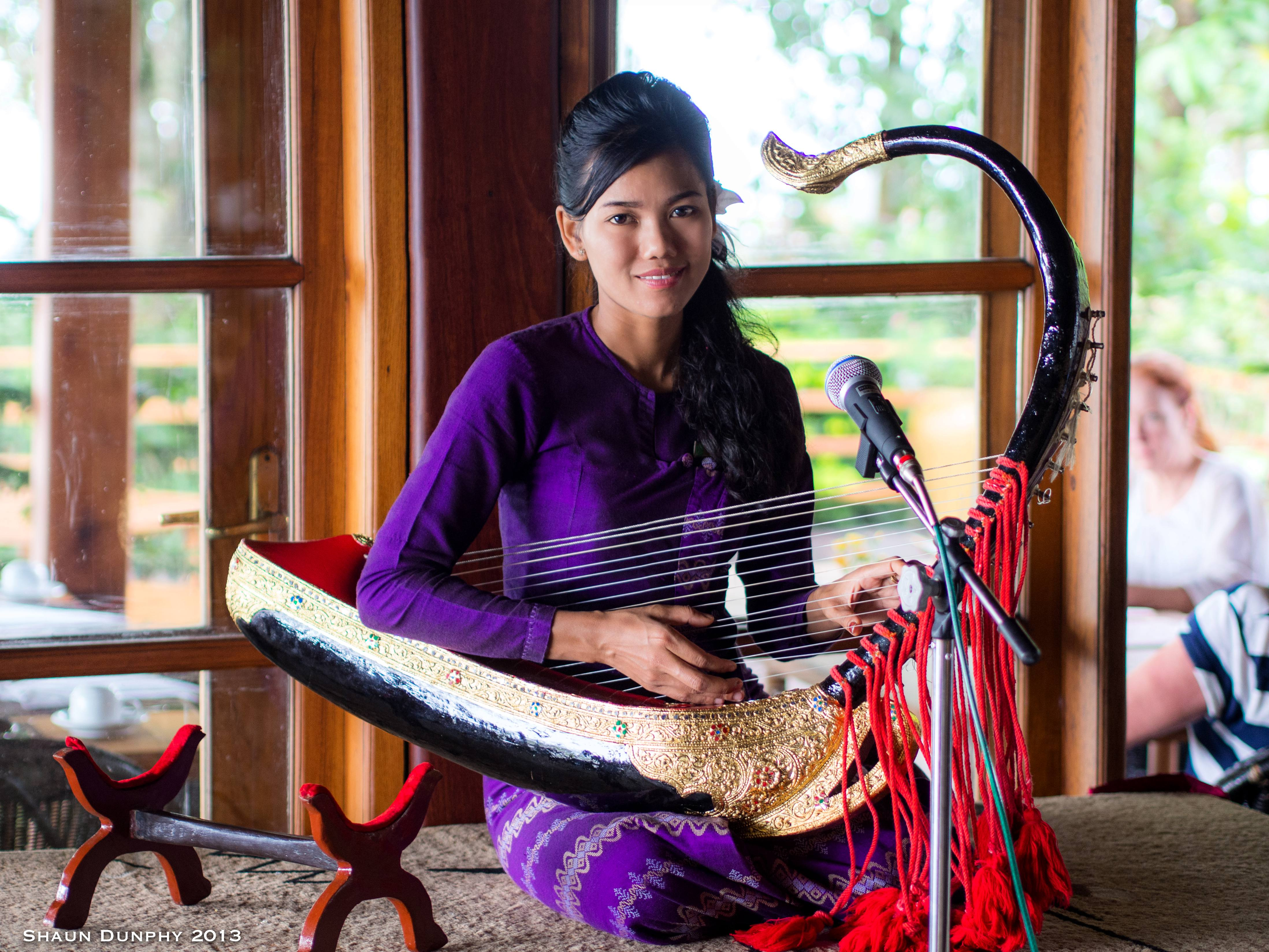
A saung (harp) musician dressed in a traditional blouse and acheik htamein.

The onset of independence reinforced the central role of clothing in Burmese national identity. While other Southeast Asian nations sought to "modernize" preferred clothing choices for their citizens (e.g., Siam with the cultural mandates, or Indonesia, with encouraging trousers over sarong for men), successive Burmese governments have encouraged the continued use of longyi by both men and women as daily wear. In a 1951 speech at the all-Burma Indian Cultural Conference, Burmese prime minister U Nu identified dress as one of the main distinctive markers of a nation, noting that national costume "carries with it that distinctive mark of culture of the rice or national which is its very backbone." The Burmese Way to Socialism continued to reinforced the practice of wearing traditional attire in favor of Western clothing.

== National costumes ==
=== Longyi ===
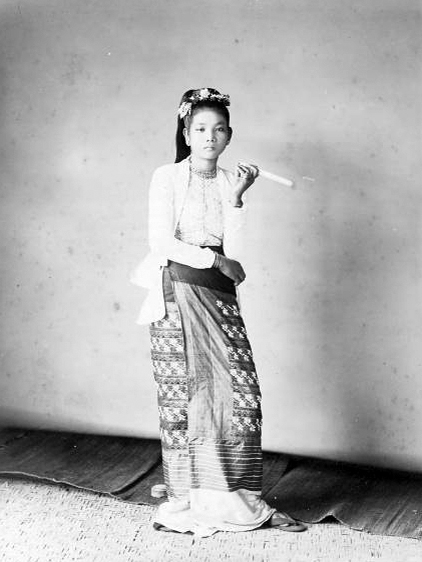
A Burmese woman dressed in a pre-colonial htamein.

The national costume of Myanmar is the longyi (လုံချည်, Burmese pronunciation: [lòʊɴd͡ʑì]), an ankle-length wraparound skirt worn by both males and females. The longyi in its modern form was popularized during the British colonial period, replacing the traditional paso worn by men and htamein worn by women in pre-colonial times.

The pre-colonial htamein features a broad train called yethina (ရေသီနား) and is only seen in modern times as wedding attire or a dance costume. Similarly, the pre-colonial paso is only commonly worn during stage performances, including dances and anyeint performances as well as wedding or high social events.

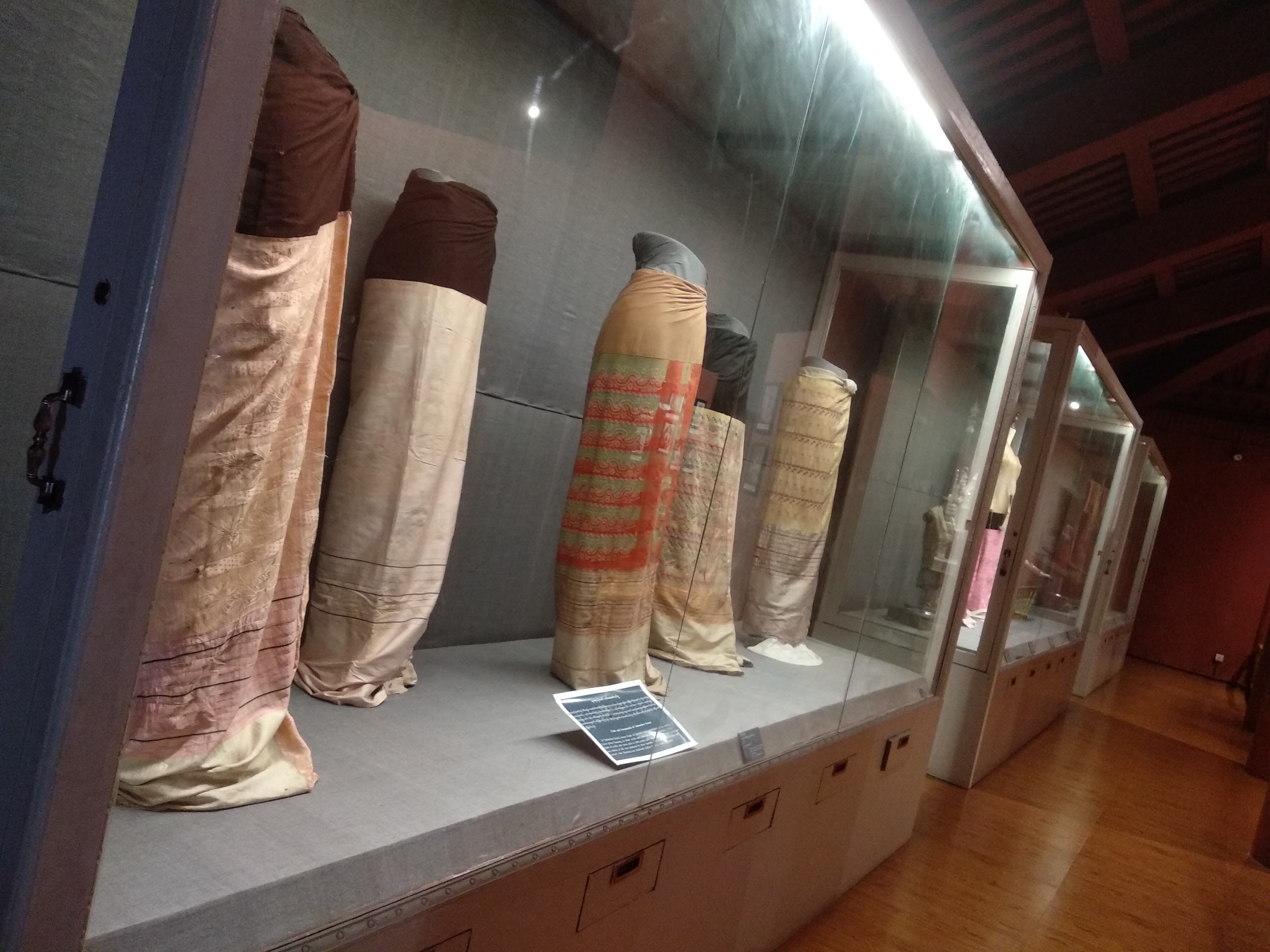
19th century, late of Konbaung dynasty's htamain or byant htamain with acheik pattern

=== Acheik textiles ===
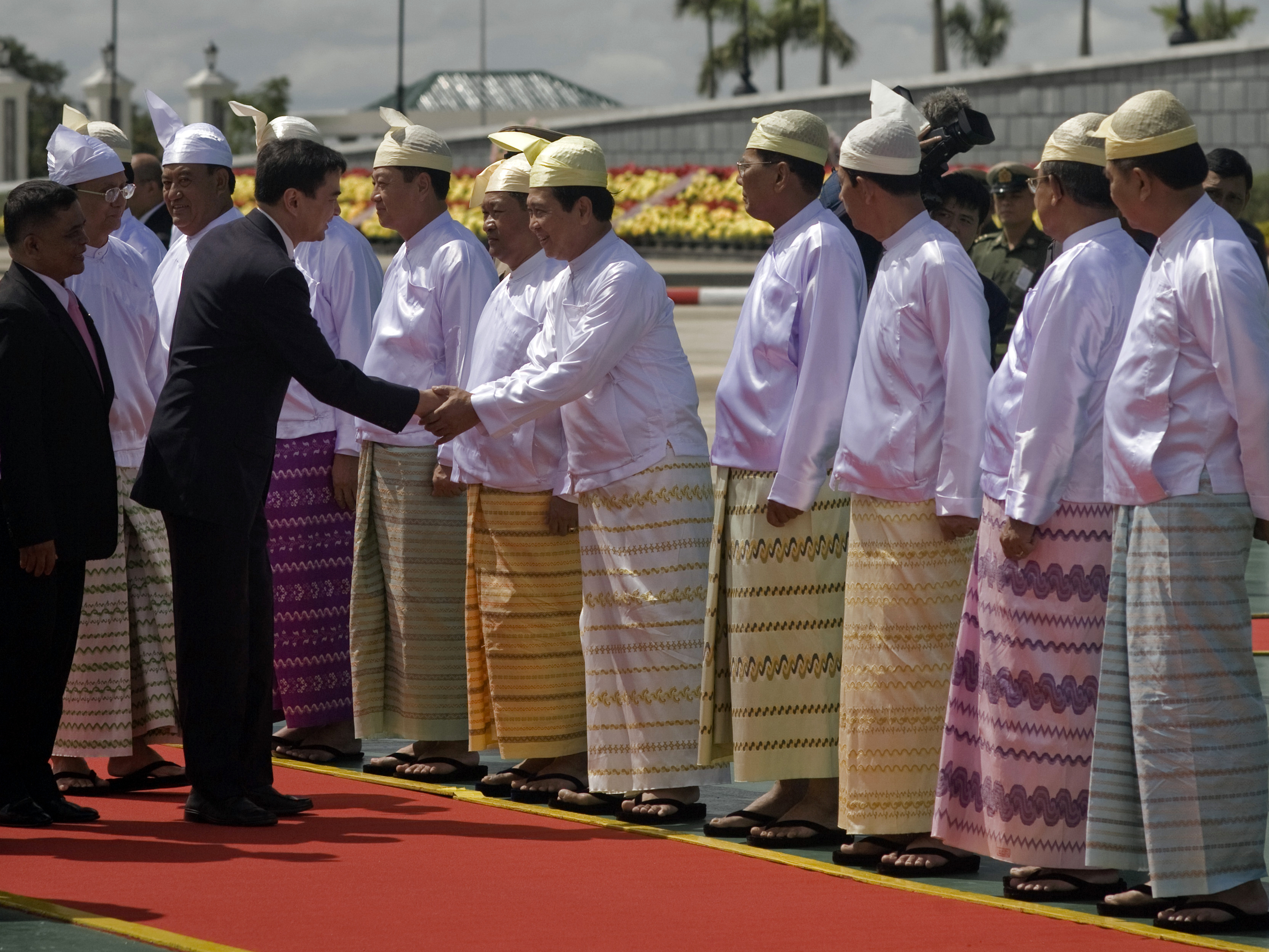
Members of Myanmar's State Peace and Development Council dressed in acheik longyi

The indigenous Burmese textile pattern, called acheik (အချိတ်; [ʔət͡ɕʰeɪʔ]) or luntaya acheik (လွန်းတစ်ရာအချိတ်), features intricate waves interwoven with bands of horizontal stripes, embellished with arabesque designs. Luntaya (လွန်းတစ်ရာ; [lʊ́ɴtəjà]), which literally means a "hundred shuttles,"refers to the time-consuming, expensive, and complex process of weaving this pattern, which requires using 50 to 200 individual shuttles, each wound with a different color of silk. The weaving is labor-intensive, requiring at least two weavers to manipulate the shuttles to achieve the interwoven wave-like patterns.

Acheik is most commonly used as a textile for male paso or female htamein. The color palettes used in acheik incorporate a bold array of contrasting shades in a similar color range to create a shimmering trompe-l'œil effect. Designs for men feature simpler zig-zag, cable and interlocking lappet motifs, while those for women interweave undulating waves with arabesque embellishments such as floral motifs or creepers.

The towns of Amarapura and Wundwin remain major domestic centers of traditional acheik weaving, although in recent years, cheaper factory-produced imitations from China and India have significantly disrupted Myanmar's traditional cottage industry.

Acheik weaving originates in Amarapura, near the Pahtodawgyi pagoda. The name acheik may derive from the name of the quarter in which the weavers lived, Letcheik Row (လက်ချိတ်တန်း); the term itself was previously called waik (ဝိုက်), referring to the woven zig-zag pattern.

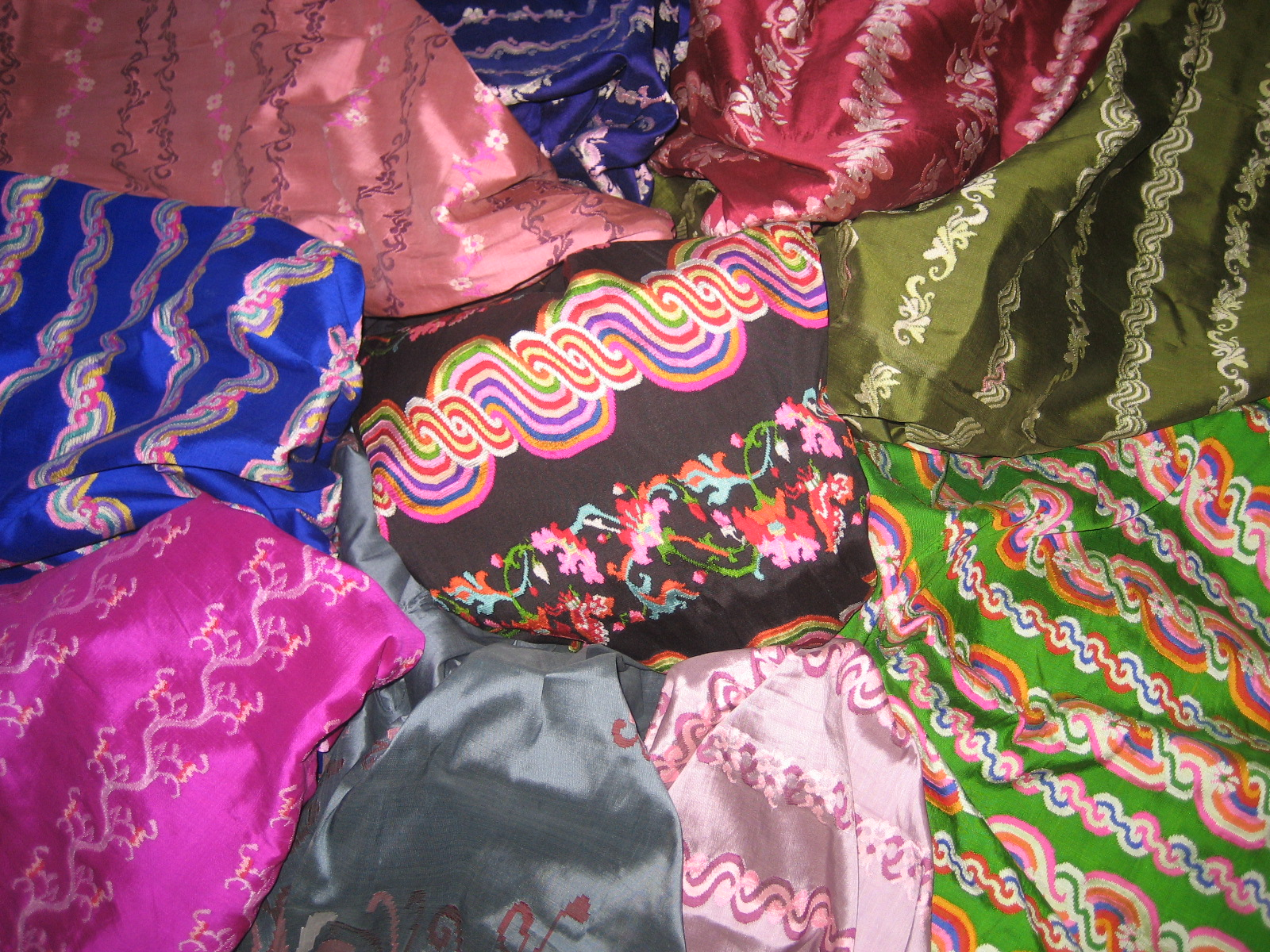
Different styles of Acheik textile pattern

While some sources claim that the acheik pattern was introduced by Manipuri weavers during the late 1700s, there are no comparable Manipuri textiles that resemble acheik. The wave-like patterns may have in fact been inspired by Neolithic motifs and natural phenomena (i.e., waves, clouds, indigenous flora and fauna). Acheik-type designs are found on pottery dating back to the Pyu city states (400s-900s CE), as well as in temple wall paintings dating back to the Bagan Kingdom era (1000s-1200s CE). Tributary gifts bestowed to the Burmese royal court may also have provided an additional source of inspiration. The textile became popular during the Konbaung dynasty, during which sumptuary laws regulated who could wear acheik clothing. The acheik pattern was exclusively worn by members of the royal court, officials, and their entourages.

=== Taikpon jacket ===
For business and formal occasions, Bamar men wear a Manchu jacket called a taikpon eingyi (တိုက်ပုံအင်္ကျီ, [taɪʔpòʊɴ]) over a mandarin collar shirt. This costume was popularized during the colonial era.

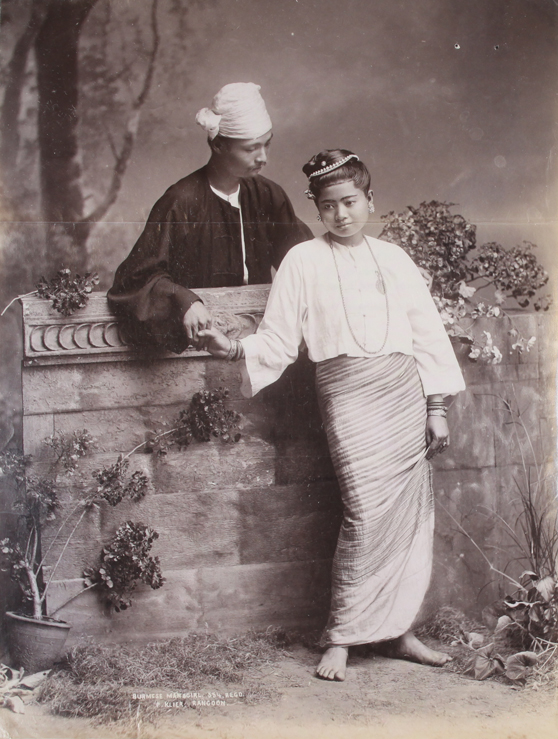
Photograph of Burmese man in taikpon jacket and girl in yinzi blouse (1906)

=== Female eingyi ===
Burmese women wear blouses called eingyi (အင်္ကျီ [ʔéɪɴd͡ʑì]). There are two prevalent styles of eingyi: yinzi (ရင်စေ့) buttoned at the front, or yinbon (ရင်ဖုံး), buttoned at the side. For formal and religious occasions, Burmese women typically don a shawl.

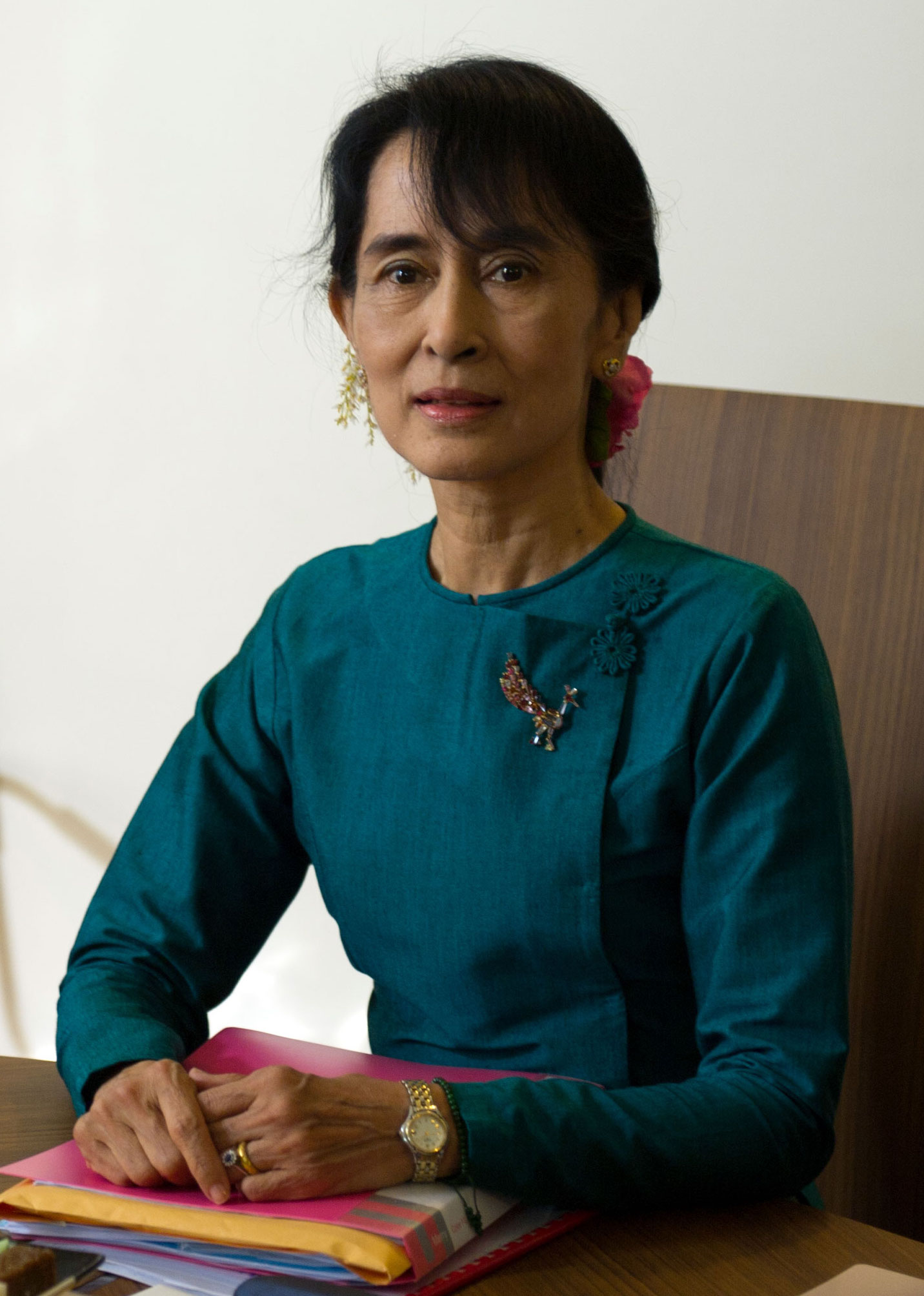
Aung San Suu Kyi in yinbon-style blouse (2011)

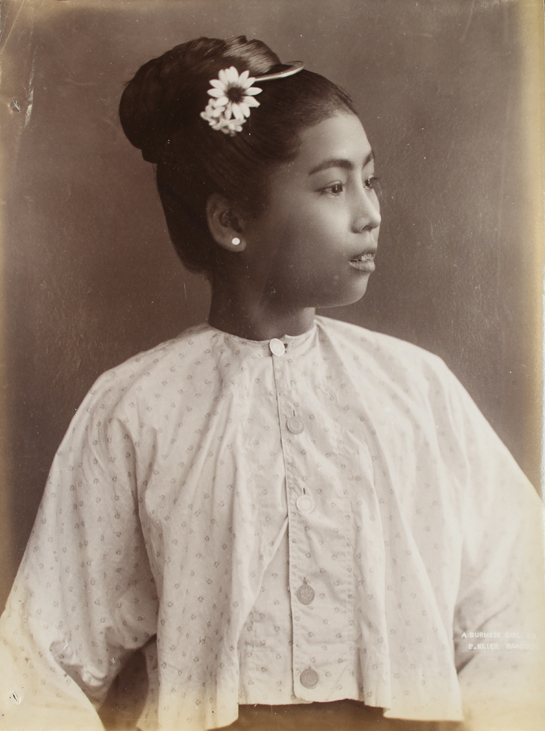
A Burmese girl in yinzi-style eingyi blouse (1907)

=== Htaingmathein jacket ===
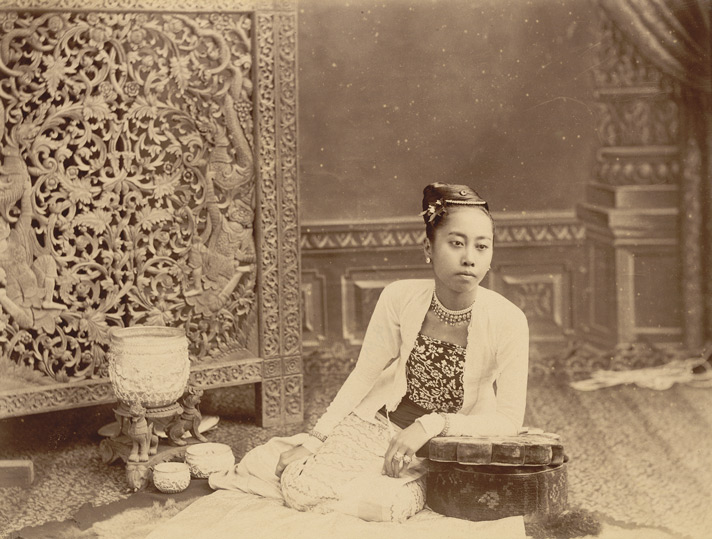
In this colonial-era photo, a woman is dressed in a yinkhan (bodice), and htaingmathein (jacket).

The most formal rendition of Myanmar's national costume for females includes a buttonless tight-fitting hip-length jacket called htaingmathein (ထိုင်မသိမ်း, [tʰàɪɴməθéɪɴ]), sometimes with flared bottoms and embroidered sequins. Htaingmathein in Burmese literally means "does not gather while sitting," referring to the fact that the tight-fitting jacket does not crumple up when sitting. This jacket was popular among the aristocratic classes during the Konbaung dynasty and modern day upper classes, and is now most commonly worn by females as wedding attire, or as traditional dance costume as well as high social events sometimes. The htaingmathein is worn over a bodice called yinkhan (ရင်ခံ, [jɪ̀ɴkʰàɴ]). Historically, the htaingmathein also had a pair of pendulous appendages on both sides called kalano (ကုလားနို့).

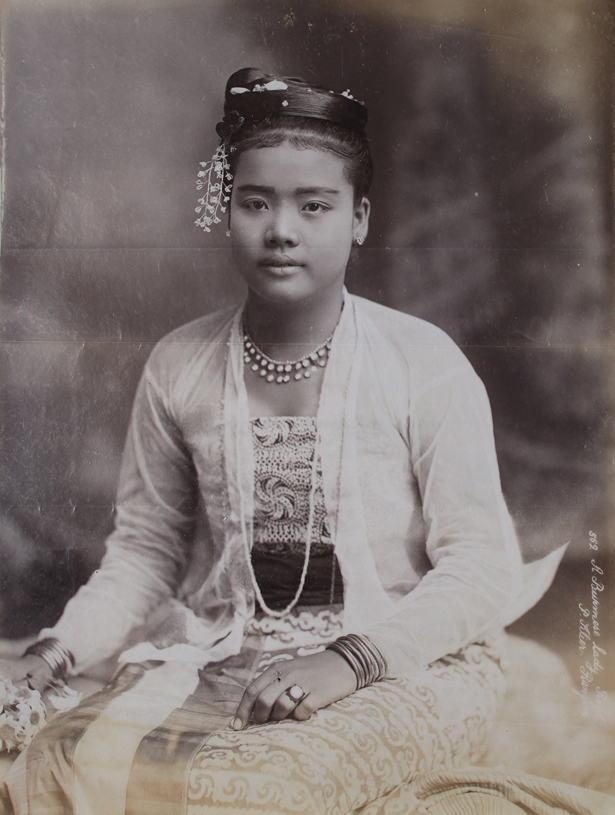
Burmese lady in 1907 CE.

=== Sibone ===
Sibone (Burmese: စည်းပုံ, Burmese pronunciation: [síbòʊɴ]) is a ceremonial headdress worn by Burmese women. In the pre-colonial era, the sibone was worn exclusively as royal attire by high-ranking females at the Burmese court, including the queens and princesses. The sibone, along with the mahālatā, formed the ceremonial dress for Burmese state functions. In modern-day Myanmar, the sibone is worn by girls during the ear piercing ceremony, and by Burmese dancers.

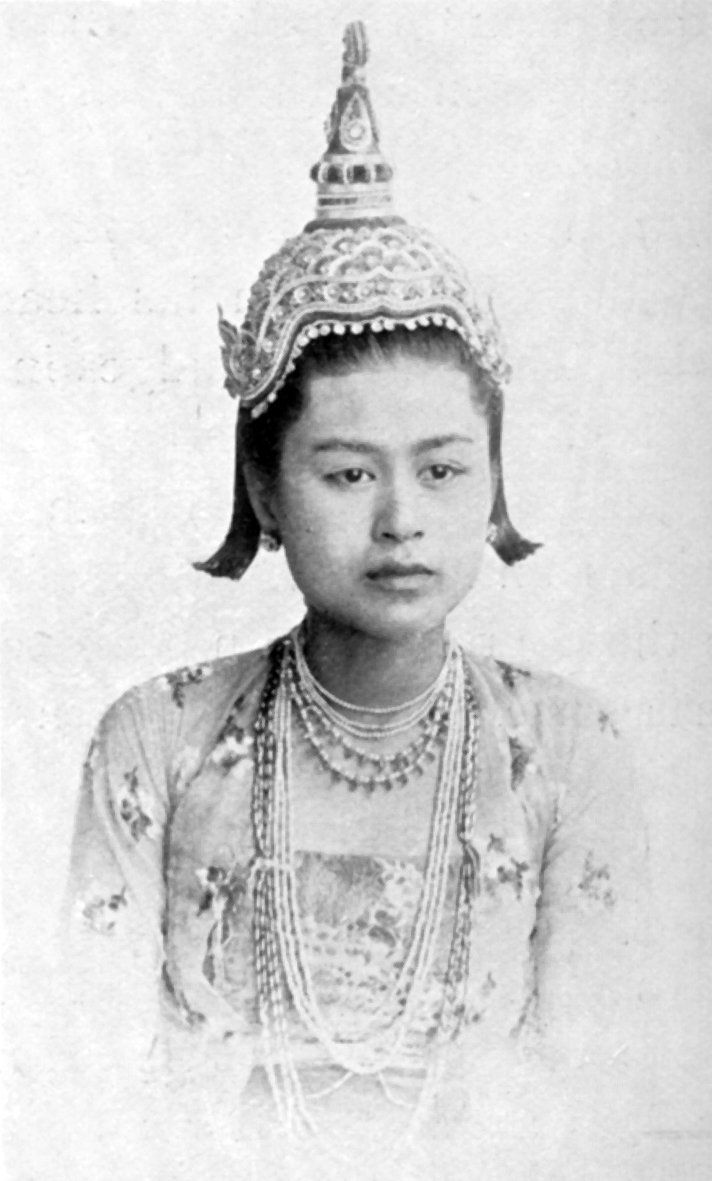
Burmese princess with Sibone headdress

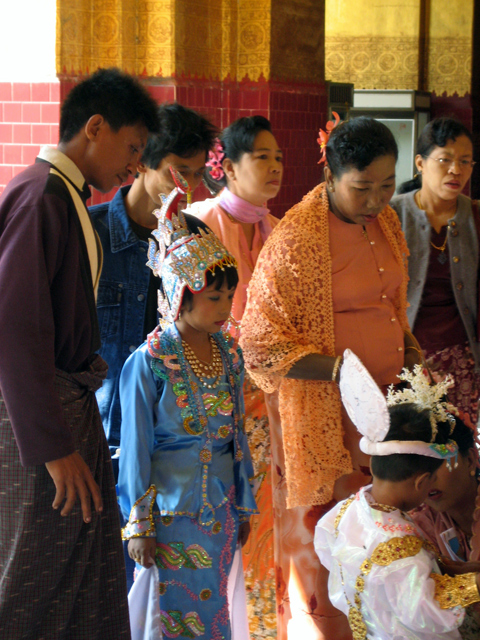
Young Burmese girl with traditional attire including Sibone

=== Gaungbaung ===
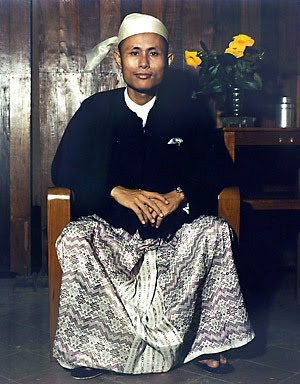
Aung San dons a gaung baung and taikpon (jacket).

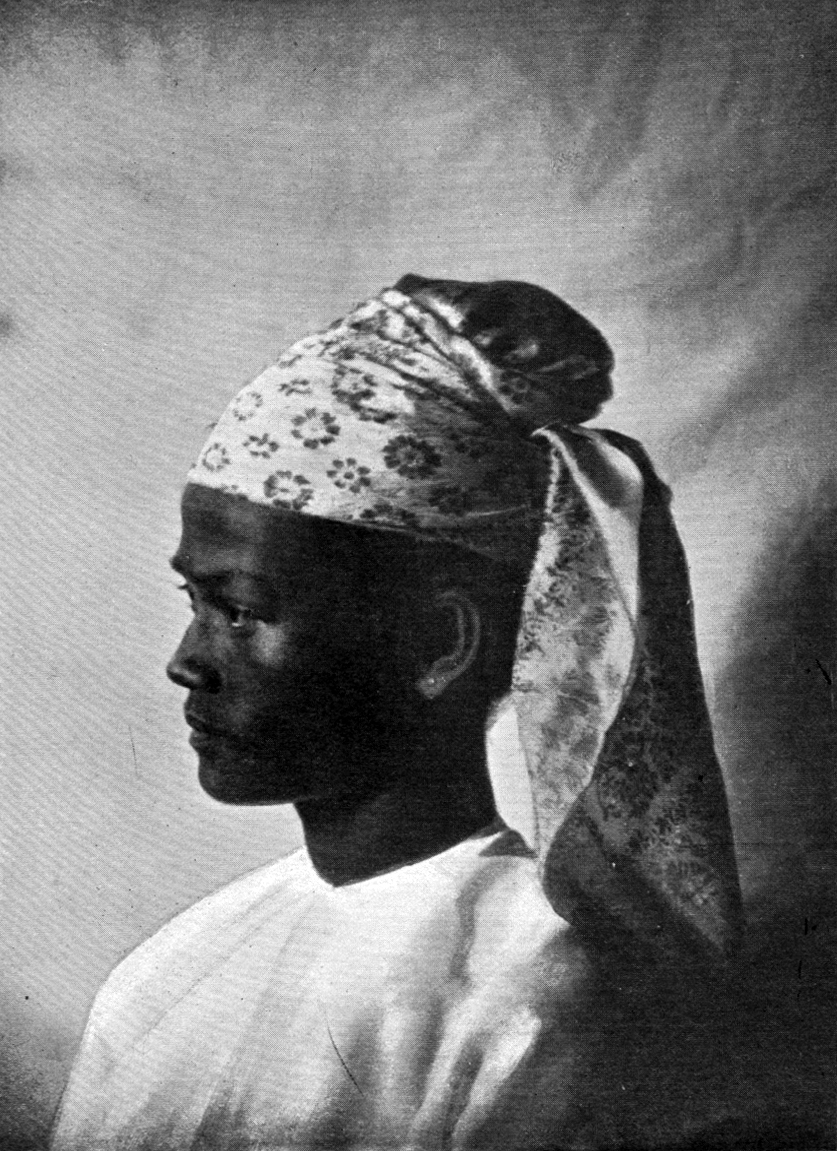
Portrait of a Burmese man in Gaung Baung in early 1900s.

The Burmese national costume for men includes a kerchief called gaung baung (ခေါင်းပေါင်း, [ɡáʊɴbáʊɴ]), which is worn for formal functions. During the colonial era, the gaung baung was streamlined as an article of formal attire. The design of the modern Burmese gaung baung emerged in the mid-1900s and is called maung kyetthayay (မောင့်ကျက်သရေ). It is a ready-made gaung baung made of cloth wrapped in a rattan frame and can be worn like a hat is worn.

=== Formal footwear ===
Both genders wear velvet sandals called gadiba phanat (ကတ္တီပါဖိနပ်‌, also called Mandalay phanat) as formal footwear.

== Regional costumes ==
The various ethnic groups of Myanmar all have distinct clothing and textile traditions. The ethnic costumes across most Burmese ethnic groups generally consist of a sarong-like longyi using various patterns or textiles.

=== Chin peoples ===
The Chin peoples are a heterogenous collection of ethnic groups that generally live in western Myanmar and speak related Kuki-Chin languages. Chin women generally wear ankle-length longyis using various textiles, and front-opening blouses, in addition to accessories like metallic belts. Chin men wear generally shirts and trousers, over which a blanket-like wrap is worn, as traditional attire.

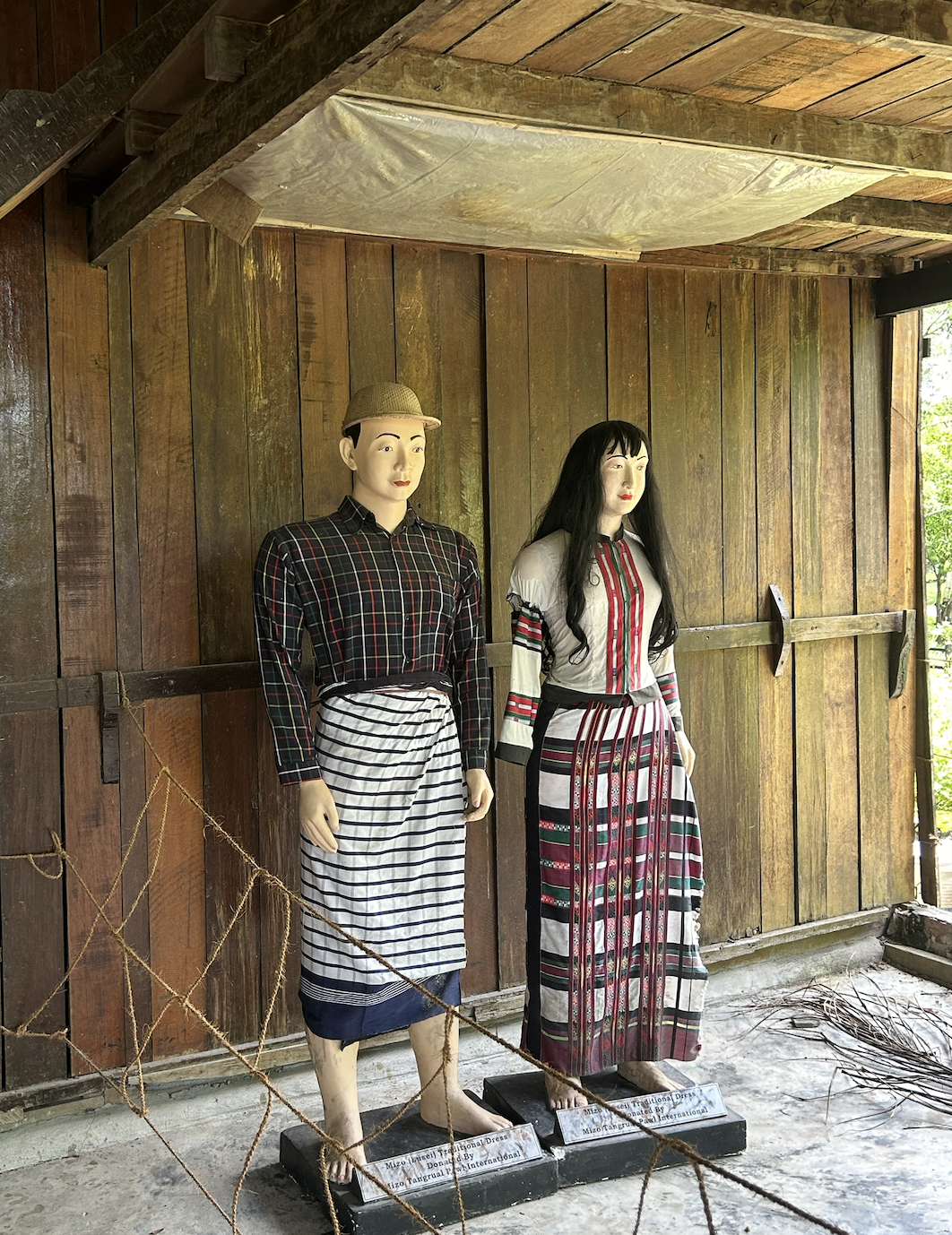
Lushai Chin attire, National Races Village, Yangon

=== Kachin peoples ===
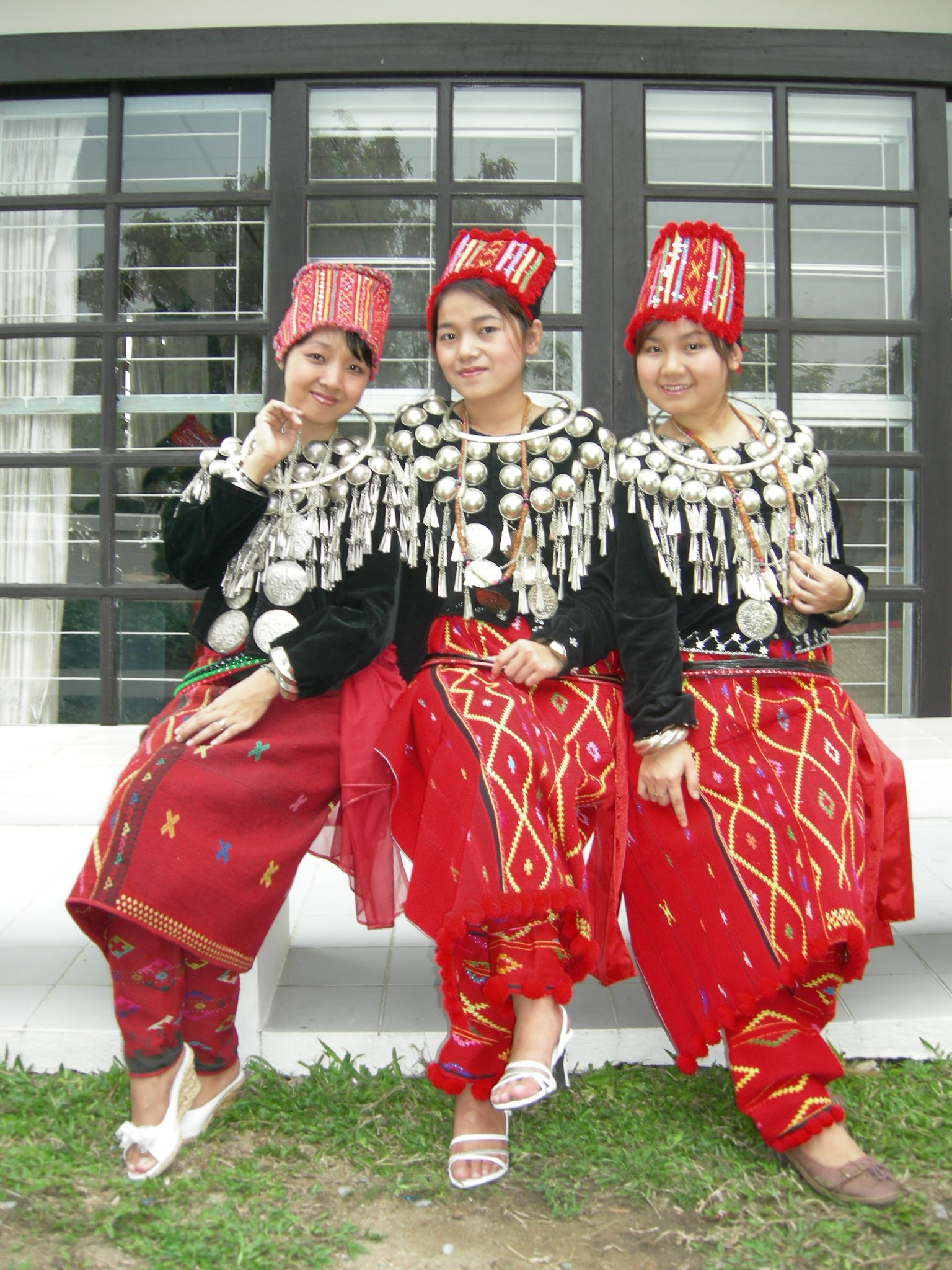
Women dressed in traditional Jingphaw attire.

The Kachin peoples are a heterogenous collection of ethnic groups that live in northern Myanmar (Kachin State), with each ethnic group possessing their own variation of traditional attire. Generally speaking, Kachin men and women wear longyis featuring geometric or checkered patterns associated with handwoven Kachin textiles. Jingphaw women also adorn themselves with metallic shawls studded with silver coins over their blouses.

=== Karen peoples ===
The Karen peoples are a heterogenous collection of ethnic groups that live in eastern Myanmar (Kayin State and Mon State) and in the Irrawaddy Delta. For traditional attire, Karen men traditionally wear headdresses with tassels hanging loose on the right side of the head, as well as sleeveless tunics over longyis. Karen women dress in long tunics and longyis, with headbands that have both ends hanging in the front. Karen longyis have horizontal stripes with a parallel strip in the middle.

Karen lady in traditional costume

=== Kayah people ===
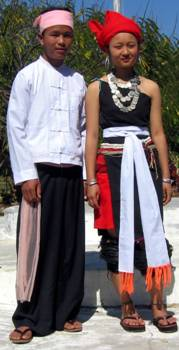
A couple dressed in traditional Kayah attire.

The Karenni people (also known as the Kayah) of both genders don headdresses; Kayah women wear red headdresses, while Kayah men wear white headdresses. Kayah women also wear red cloaks over sleeveless blouses and red or black longyis. Karen men wear baggy trousers or longyis, and may accessorize with silver daggers on special occasions.

=== Mon people ===
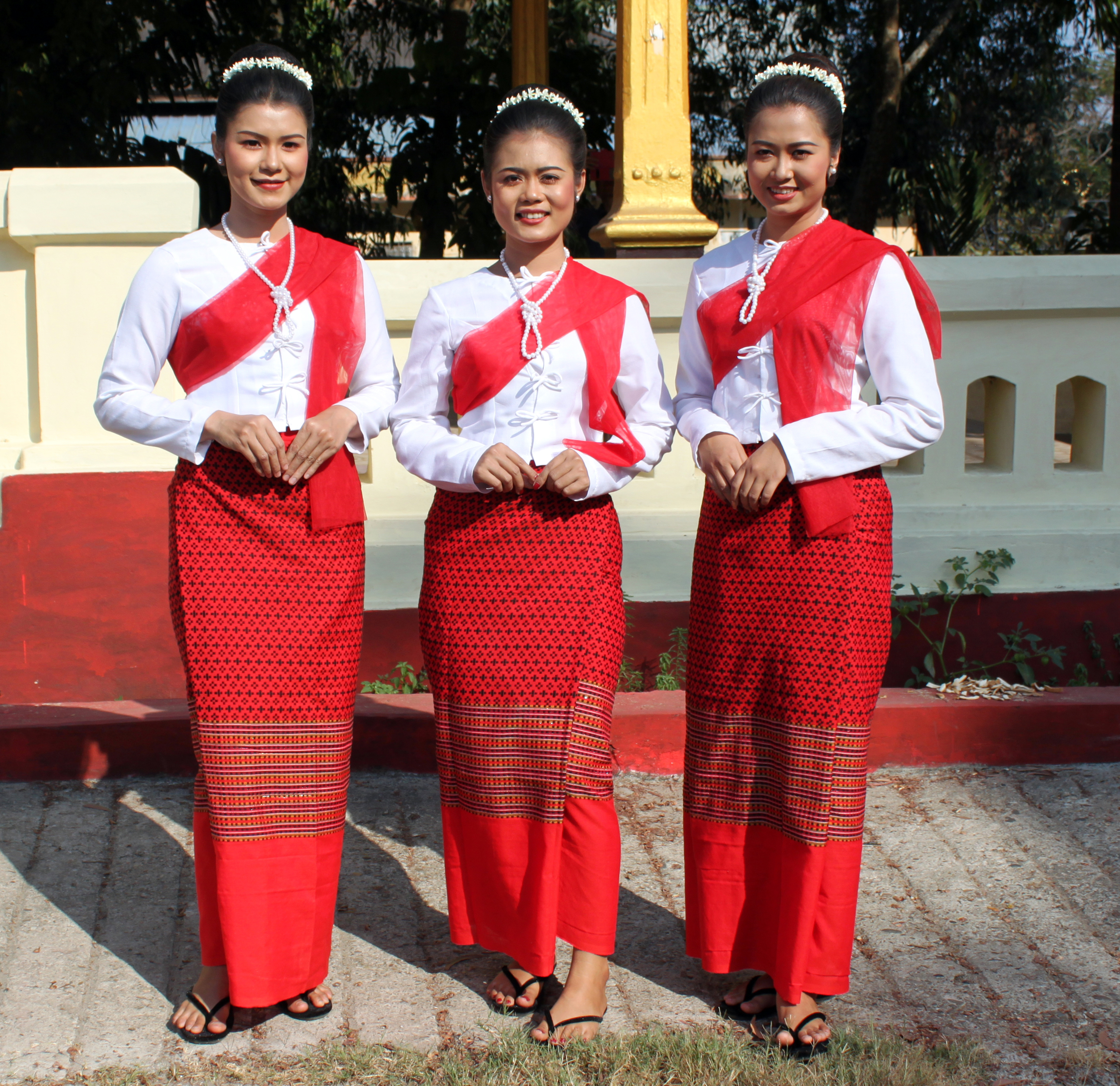
Girls in Mawlamyaing dressed in traditional Mon attire.

Mon women traditionally wear a shawl called yat toot, which is wrapped diagonally over the chest covering one shoulder with one end dropping behind the back. Archaeological evidence from the Dvaravati era (direct ancestors of the Mon people) portrays ladies wearing what seems to be a similar shawl hanging from their shoulder. Mon men traditionally wear red-checkered longyis, collarless shirts, and traditional jackets similar to Bamar men. Mon women traditionally wear their hair in a bun, wrapped around a comb.

=== Rakhine people ===
The Rakhine (Arakanese) people of both genders traditionally wear longyis. As traditional attire, Rakhine men also wear collarless shirts and taikpon jackets similar to Bamar men, and kerchiefs called gaung baung, with excess cloth draped to the left. Rakhine women wear blouses over a htaingmathein jacket, over which a sheer shawl is diagonally wrapped, passing over one shoulder.

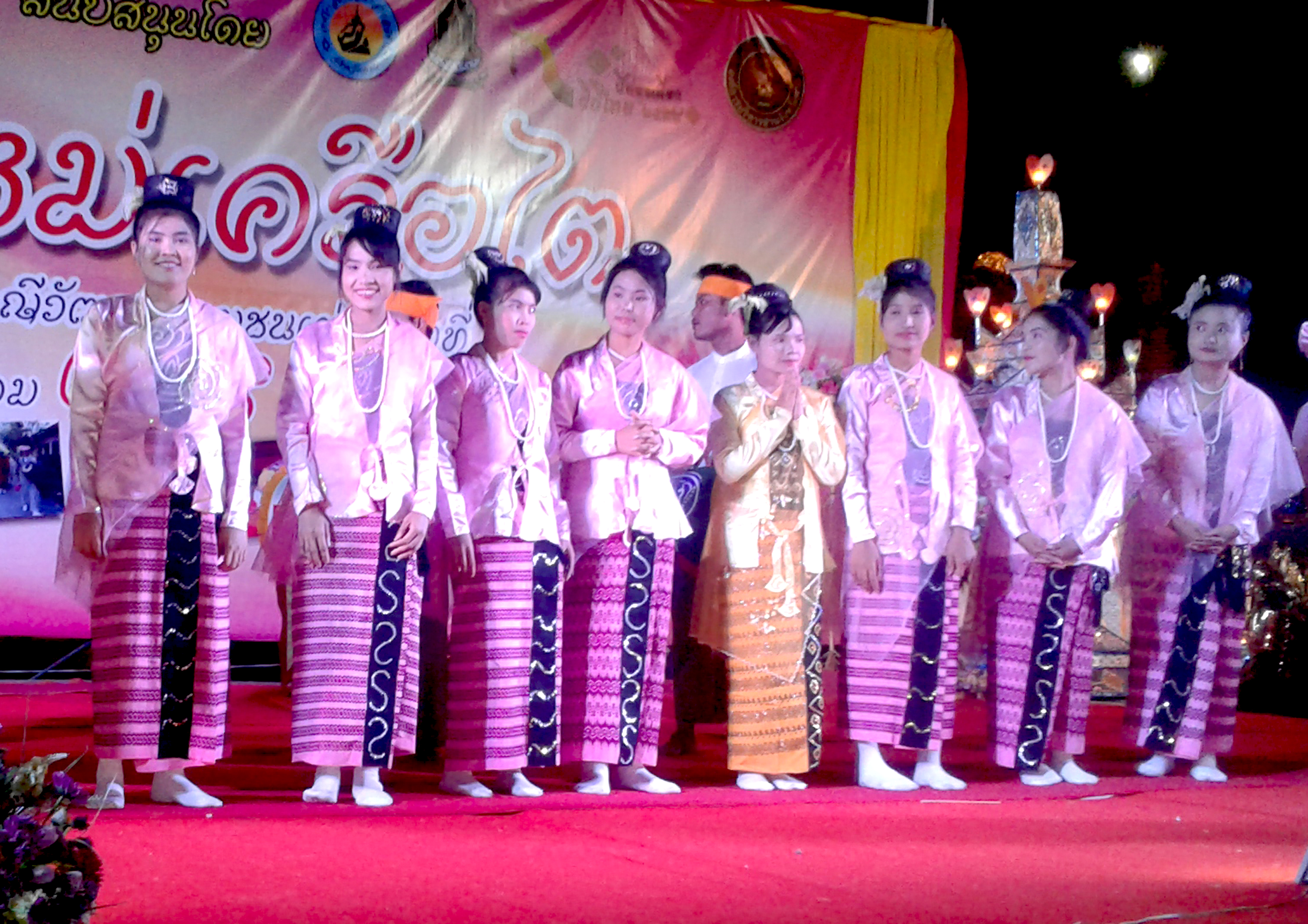
Rakhine women in their traditional costume

=== Shan people ===
The traditional attire of the Shan people varies across locales. Generally speaking, Shan men wear baggy khaki trousers similar to fisherman pants, and a headwrap. Shan women wear longyis with embroidered designs and textiles associated with their hometowns.

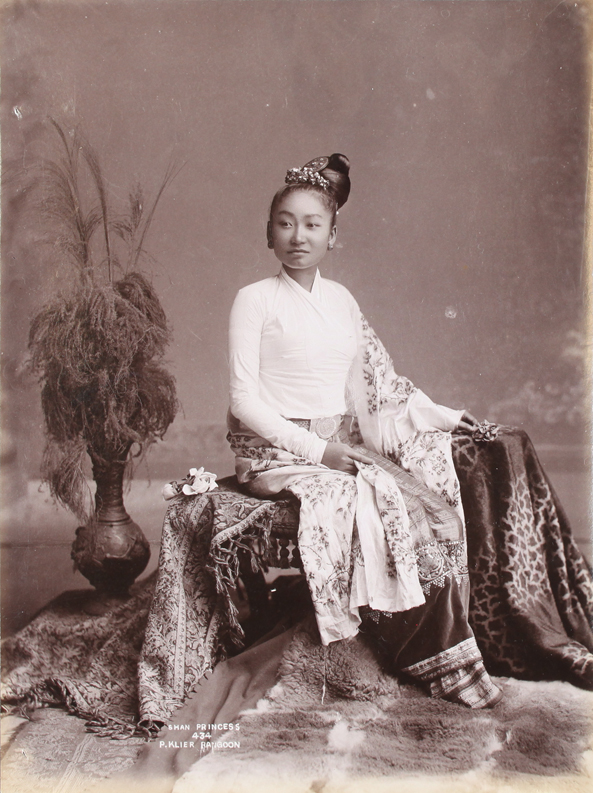
Tai Khun (Gone Shan) princess in traditional costume in 20th century (1907 CE)

== Modern costumes ==
=== Undergarments ===
Traditionally, Burmese people did not wear undergarments. But nowadays, it is found that young Burmese people, especially those in urban area, prefer to wear modern undergarments as the main thing.

Women's undergarments also became the main political campaign under the name "Panties for Peace" during the Saffron Revolution. The Project focuses on the superstitions of Burma's generals, particularly junta chief Than Shwe, who view contact with any item of women's wear as depriving them of their power. Women throughout the world have been sending packages to Burmese embassies containing panties; the campaign has spread to Australia, Europe, Singapore and Thailand. Women's clothes, including undergarments, were also used during protests against the coup in 2021 for the same reasons.

== See also ==
- Culture of Myanmar
- Pinni (cloth)
- Folk costume
