= Gaung baung =

Burmese kerchief

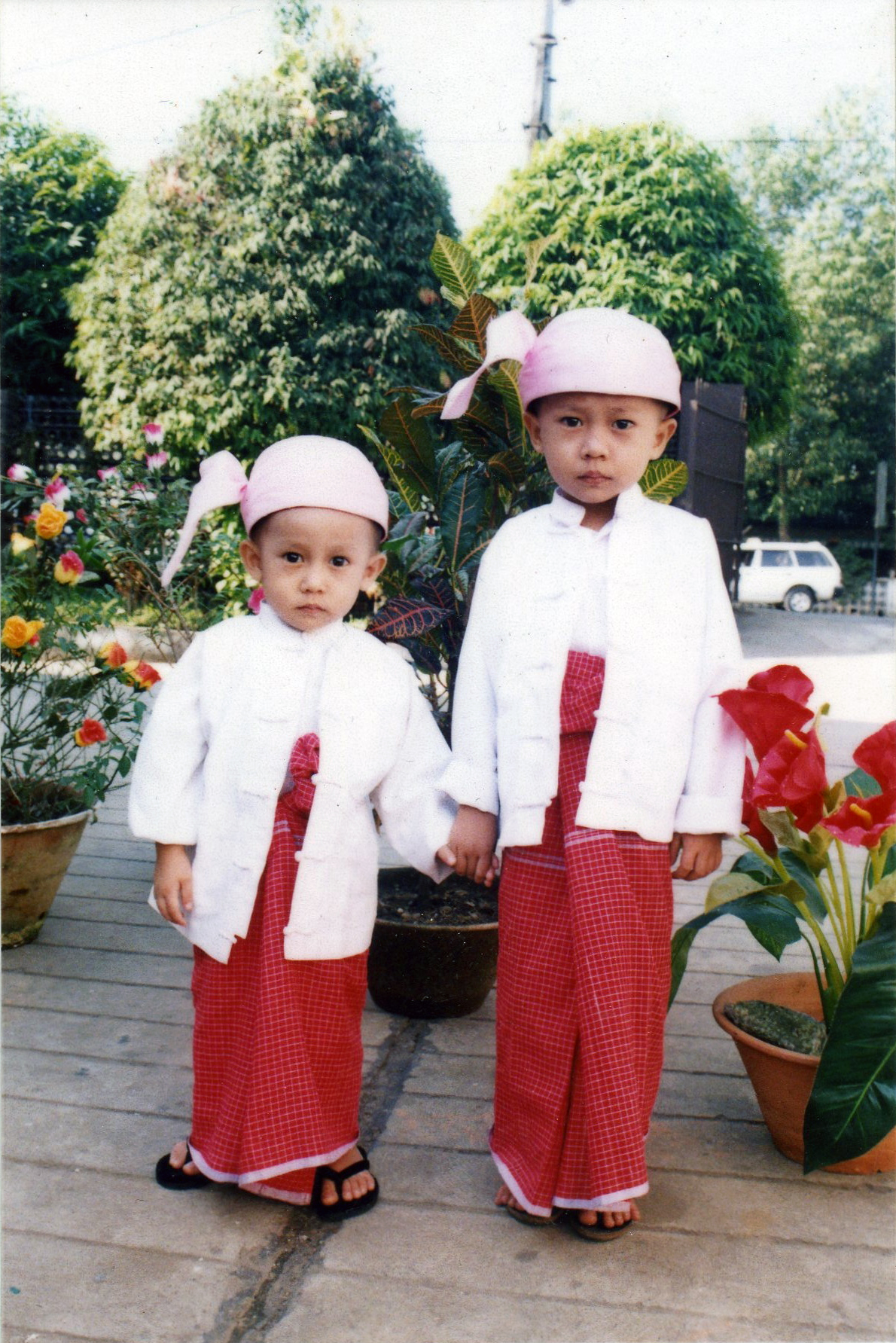
- Two young Mon boys wearing Mon coloured paso and gaung baung
- Type: Headwear
- Material: Silk, cotton
- Place of origin: Burma (Myanmar)

The gaung baung (Burmese: ခေါင်းပေါင်း [ɡáʊɰ̃ báʊɰ̃]; Mon: သမိၚ် ဍိုပ်, [həmoiŋ dɒp]; Shan: ၶဵၼ်းႁူဝ် [kʰén.hǒ]; Northern Thai: เคียนหัว [kʰīan hǔa]) is a traditional Burmese kerchief and part of the traditional attire of many ethnic groups inhabiting modern day Burma and Northern Thailand, particularly among most of the Buddhist-professing ethnic groups: the Bamar, Mon, Arakanese, Shan, and Tai Yuan peoples. The design varies from region to region, but share basic similarities that distinguish the gaung baung from the kerchief.

Gaung baung literally means "head wrap" in the Burmese language. It is part of traditional ceremonial attire, worn at formal gatherings and ceremonies. The gaung baung is almost always a sign of rank, though no insignia or pattern exists to denote it. The gaung baung is more prevalent among the Arakanese and Shan ethnic groups.

== Design and style ==
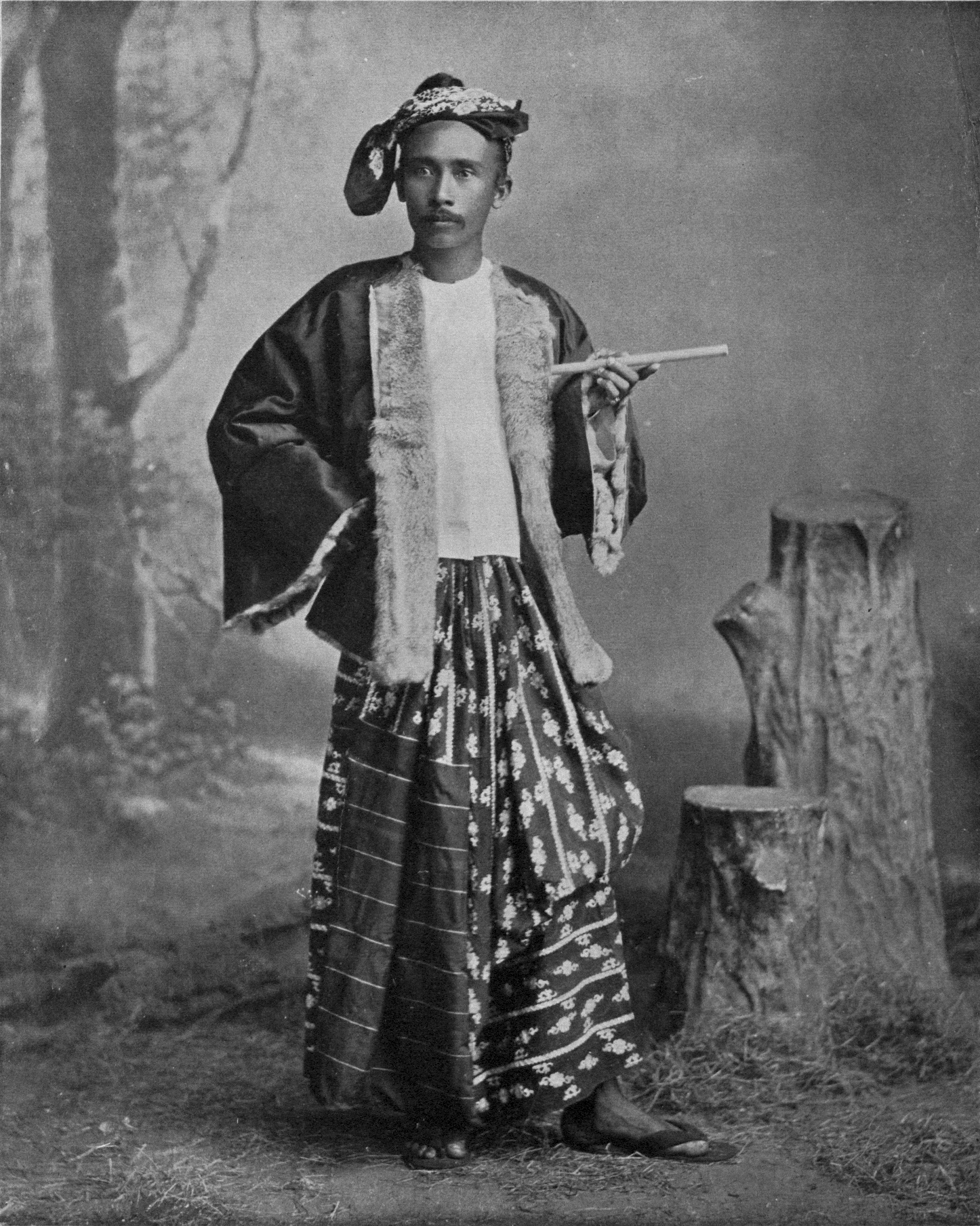
A man wearing a gaung baung typical of the style in the late 1800s.

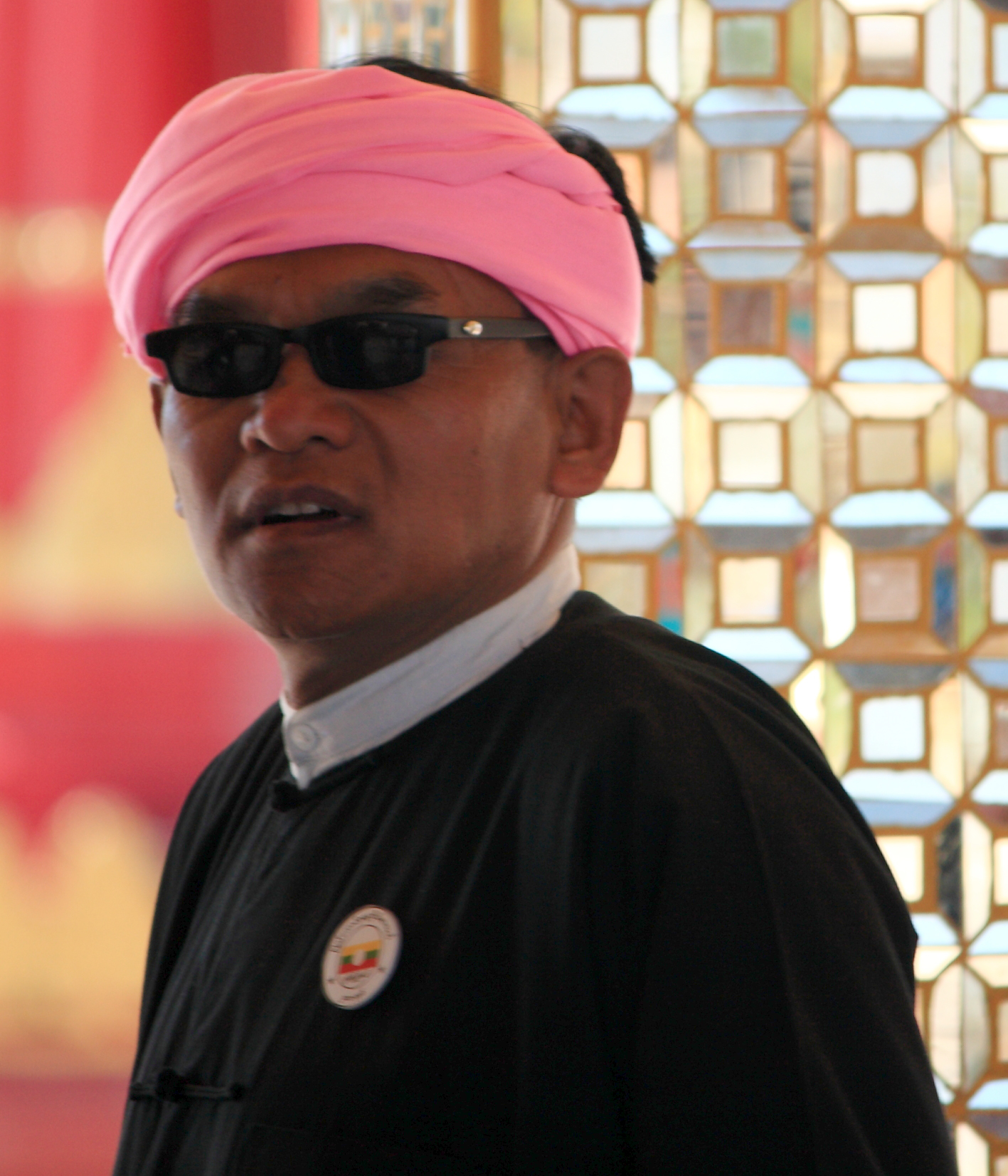
A man wearing a gaung baung in the traditional Shan style.

The design of the modern Burmese gaung baung emerged in the mid-20th century and is called maung kyetthayay (မောင့်ကျက်သရေ). It is a ready-made gaung baung made of cloth wrapped around a rattan frame and can be worn like a hat is worn. In the colonial era, silk gaung baungs called "B.A. gaung baung," traditionally worn at graduation ceremonies, were popular.

The gaung baung is usually made of silk or cotton, depending on the rank or wealth of the owner. The older wrap versions were usually 4 to 5 feet (1.2 to 1.5 m) long and 8 to 12 inches (20 to 30 cm) wide. It is put on the head in a clockwise manner, with the tongue on the left side. The tongue is the main distinguishing feature of the gaung baung, and is also different from ethnic group to ethnic group.

The Burmese and Mon gaung baung tongues tend to be sloping down and rounded, while the Arakanese (Rakhine) and Shan tongues are fanned out.

Nowadays, most do not wear the gaung baung, even to official functions. The gaung baung, along with most other articles of Burmese attire, have become streamlined. Thus, most wear ready-made and woven gaung baungs which are wrapped over a rattan or wicker frame.

== Material ==
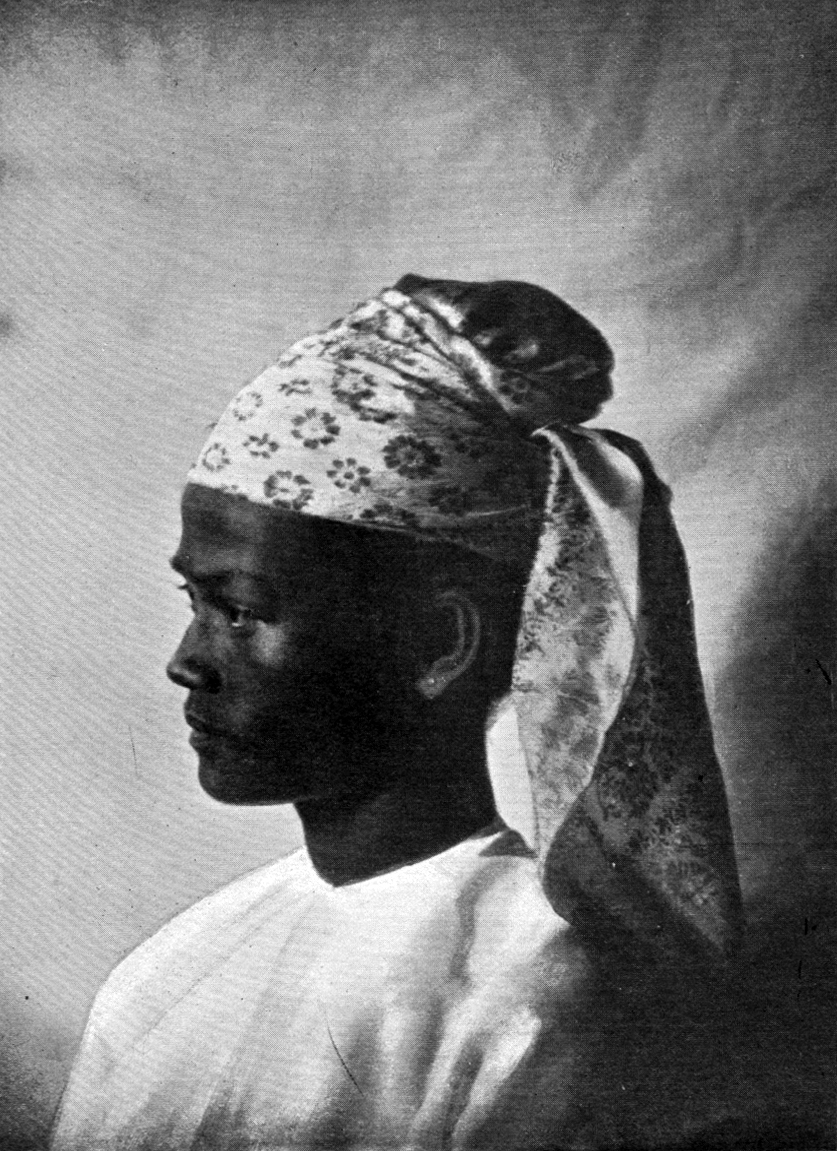
A Burman gaung baung of the predominant style in the early 1900s.

Since the gaung baung is a ceremonial headgear, it is always for beautification. Depending on the wealth and or rank of the owner, the colour and material differ.

The Burmese and Mon wear yellow, white, grey or cream coloured gaung baungs, of either silk or cotton. The Arakanese wear pink coloured ones, while the Shan is either cream, skin or tan coloured. The Shan gaung baung is made out of rough cotton, called pin, the trademark garment of the Shan people.

== Contemporary usage ==
Usage of gaung baung has declined dramatically during the British colonization. It is only worn in official ceremonies, and social functions such as weddings. Elected parliamentarians must wear one when performing their duties in parliament.

In the Northern Hill areas, the hill tribes, such as the Lahu, Akha and Palaung still wear similar gaung baungs, but for day to day wear, and they are usually made from towels.

== See also ==
- Burmese clothing
- Longyi
