= Hnyat-phanat =

Traditional sandal of Myanmar

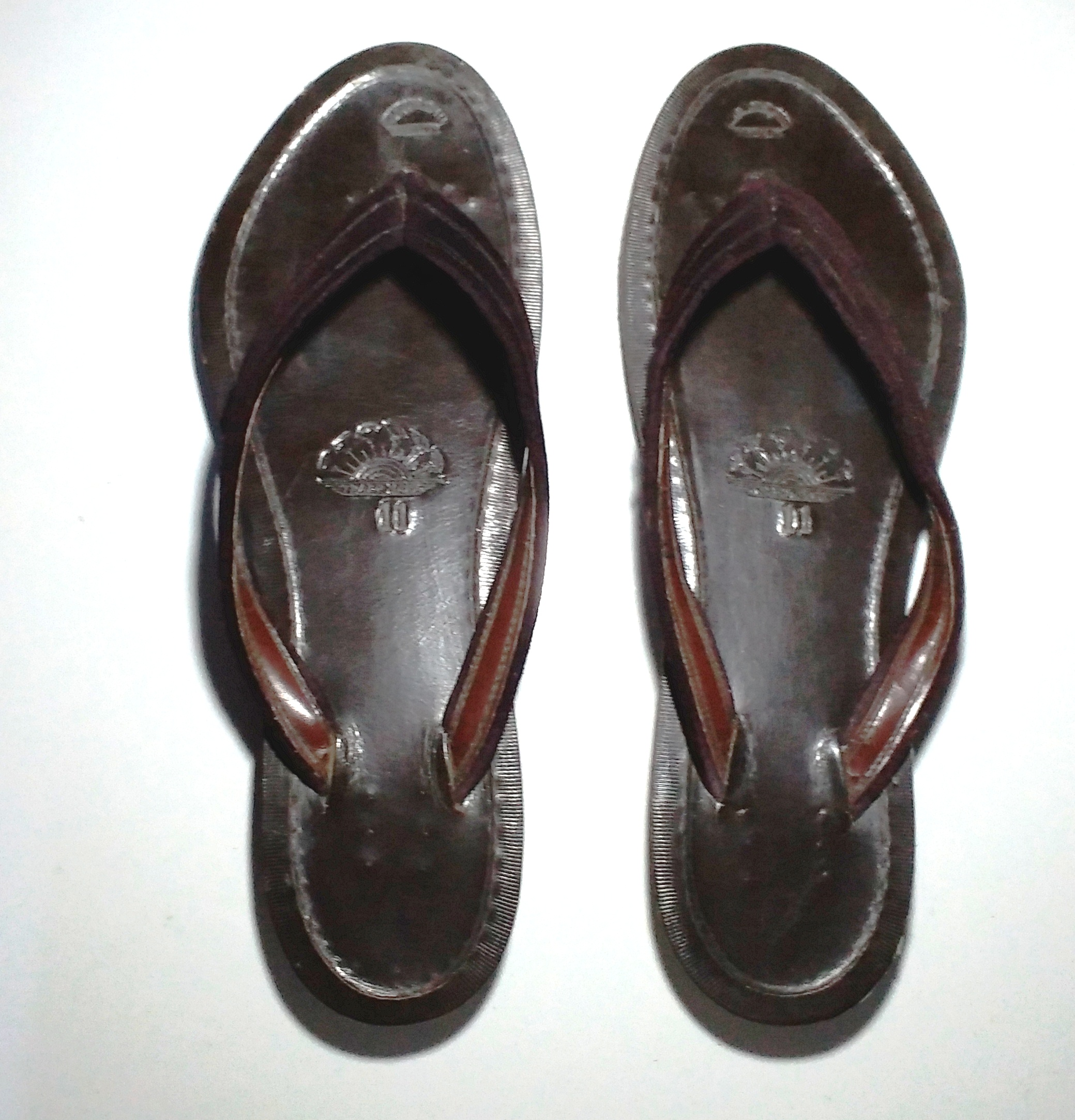
Hnyat-phanat

Hnyat-phanat (Burmese: ညှပ်ဖိနပ်; MLCTS: hnyap hpi. nap, IPA: [ɲ̥appʰənaʔ]) is a Burmese traditional sandal, similar to flip-flops. Although it refers to almost any sandal worn by the people of Myanmar, it is mostly used to refer to the traditional Mandalay velvet slippers that originate in Upper Burma (Myanmar).

Hnyat-phanat literally means 'clip footwear', since the slipper is held in place by the clipping of the big and second toe.

== Design and style ==
The slipper is very simple and is worn by almost everybody in Myanmar. It consists of a flat sole held loosely on the foot by a Y-shaped strap that passes between the first (big) and second toes and around either side of the foot. The main distinguishing feature of Burmese traditional sandals is the material.

The flat sole is plain with no patterns or designs. It is either coated with fine soft lacquer or velvet (ကတ္တီပါ gadiba), and the same goes for the Y strap. Lacquered slippers are usually either brown or black, while velvet slippers can come in a variety of colors. Velvet sandals are traditionally worn at formal occasions like weddings.

Hnyat-phanat does not have any grip or friction on the lower side of the sole, and is thus not suitable for use in wet conditions.

== See also ==
- List of shoe styles
- Longyi, a Burmese garment
