= Pinni (cloth) =

Handwoven cotton fabric of Burma

Pinni was a term for coarse cotton fabric, naturally reddish or reddish-yellow in colour, made locally in Myanmar.

== Nationalism ==
Pinni was a handwoven Burmese cloth. Inspired by the Indian Swadeshi movement's boycott of English products, pinni became a nationalist symbol in the early 20th century, often being used to cover traditional peindan sandals.
