= Yadaya =

Burmese magical ritual used to avert misfortune

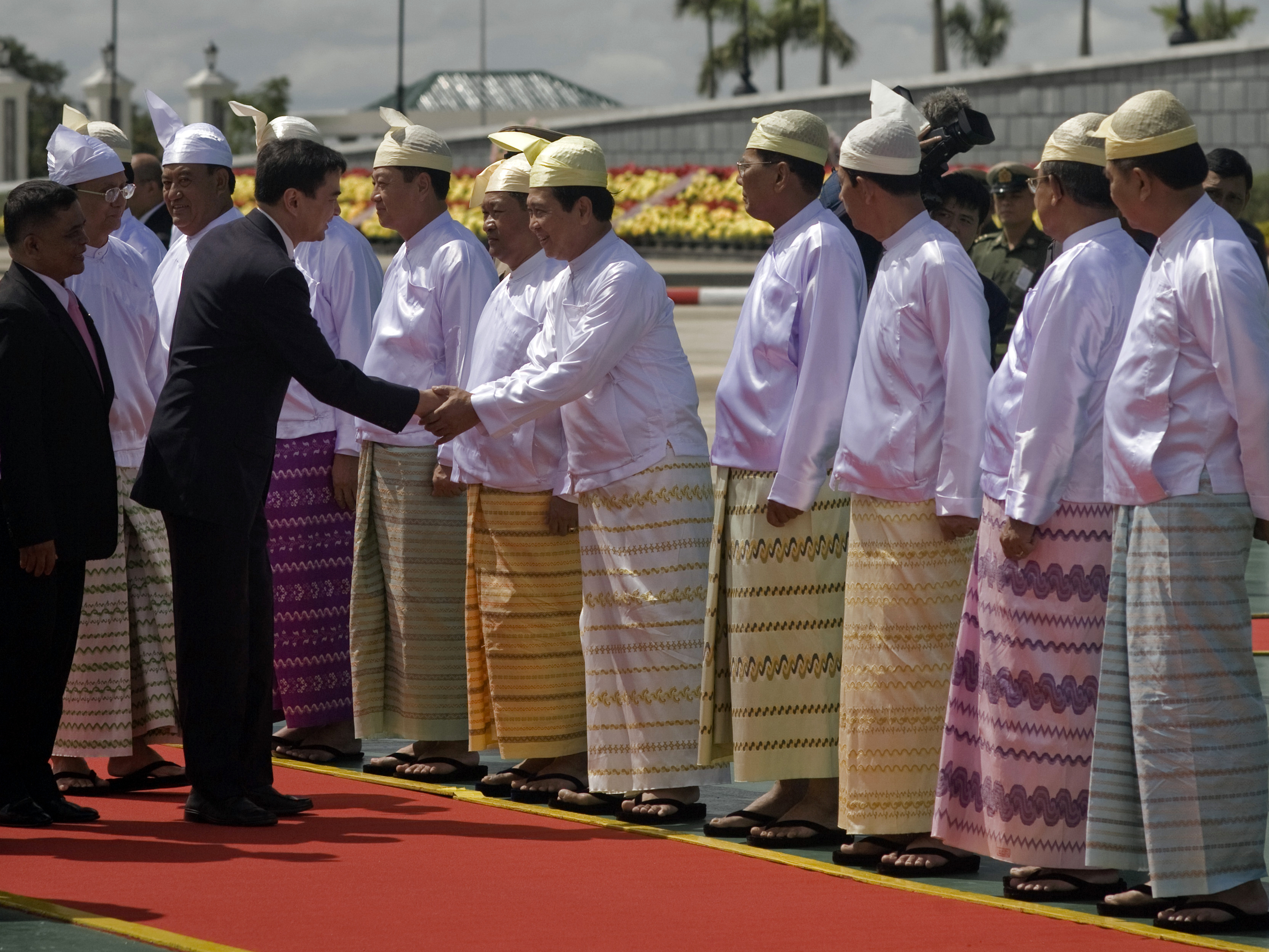
In an October 2010 state visit, Burmese State Peace and Development Council members greeted Thai PM Abhisit Vejjajiva in acheik patterned longyi typically worn by women. Various sources attributed this to yadaya practices.

Yadaya (Burmese: ယတြာ, IPA: [jɛ̀dəjà]; from Sanskrit yātra; variously spelt yadayar and yedaya) refers to superstitious magical rituals done to delay, neutralize or prevent misfortune, widely practiced in Myanmar (Burma). These rituals, which originate from Brahmanism, are guided and prescribed by soothsayers and astrologers, who use a combination of mathematical equations and astrology to formulate a "prescription" to avert misfortune. Modern Burmese leaders, including U Nu, Ne Win, Than Shwe, Min Aung Hlaing, and many government policy decisions are widely understood to have been influenced by yadaya rituals. Among Burmese Buddhists, yadaya is often linked to merit-making, as some prescriptive rituals involve seemingly "Buddhist" acts, although they are done to bypass karmic fate, which cannot be altered by ritual in Buddhist doctrine. Yadaya is closely associated with numerology, particularly the number nine, which is widely believed to be an auspicious number. Some scholars contend that yadaya originated in the Pagan period, first practiced by monks of the Ari sect, a form of Buddhism that predates the introduction of Theravada Buddhism in Burma.

One notable form of yadaya is the construction of pagodas, as seen in the construction of 60,000 pagodas by U Nu in 1961. The government's unexplained decision to change the road traffic in 1970 to right-hand traffic (even though the overwhelming majority of Burmese cars are made for left-hand traffic) is one such incident believed to be the result of yadaya, to avert the threat of a political attack from the right and an insurgency.

In 2009, the military regime began printing 5000 Myanmar kyat banknotes that feature an image of a white elephant, interpreted as an act of yadaya.

More recently, the unusual clothing choices, namely the wearing of traditional female acheik-patterned longyi (sarongs) by Than Shwe and other military generals at recent public appearances, including Union Day celebrations in February 2011 and at the reception of the Lao Prime Minister Bouasone Bouphavanh in June 2011 have also been attributed to yadaya, as a way to divert power to neutralize Aung San Suu Kyi's power.

== See also ==
- Yantra
- Yantra tattooing
