= Tattooing in Myanmar =

Tattooing in Myanmar was a widespread custom practiced by various ethnic groups, including the Bamar, Shan, Chin, and Karen, until the 20th century. Tattooing was a distinguishing cultural marker and a symbol of strength, courage and intimidation for Lethwei fighters.

== Origins ==
Among the Bamar, the custom of tattooing originates from the pyu (Tibeto-burman) people, that show pyu dancer with tattoo recorded by tang dynasty, nowadays China.

The Arakanese people who are related to the Bamar did not practice tattooing. Similarly, the Mon people did practice tattooing, but did not tattoo their thighs unlike the Bamar.

However, with the onset of colonial rule in Burma, the practice of tattooing quickly became extinct, particularly in Burmese towns. During the 1930s, tattooing saw a resurgence in popularity among rebels who participated in peasant and millennial uprisings. Men tattooed themselves to provide immunity to bullets and knives. During the 2010s, tattooing grew in popularity among Burmese youth.

=== Pigments ===
Burmese tattoo pigments traditionally used diluted red mercury sulphide and soot from an oil lamp. For black pigments, the soot was mixed with the dried gallbladder of fish or cattle in powder form, boiled in water and simmered with the leaves of bitter melon. A product was reduced to a paste form and dried until usage. A greenish tinge was produced by dabbing the pierced areas of the skin with leaves of Senna siamea or Brugmansia suaveolens.

== Tattooing among men ==
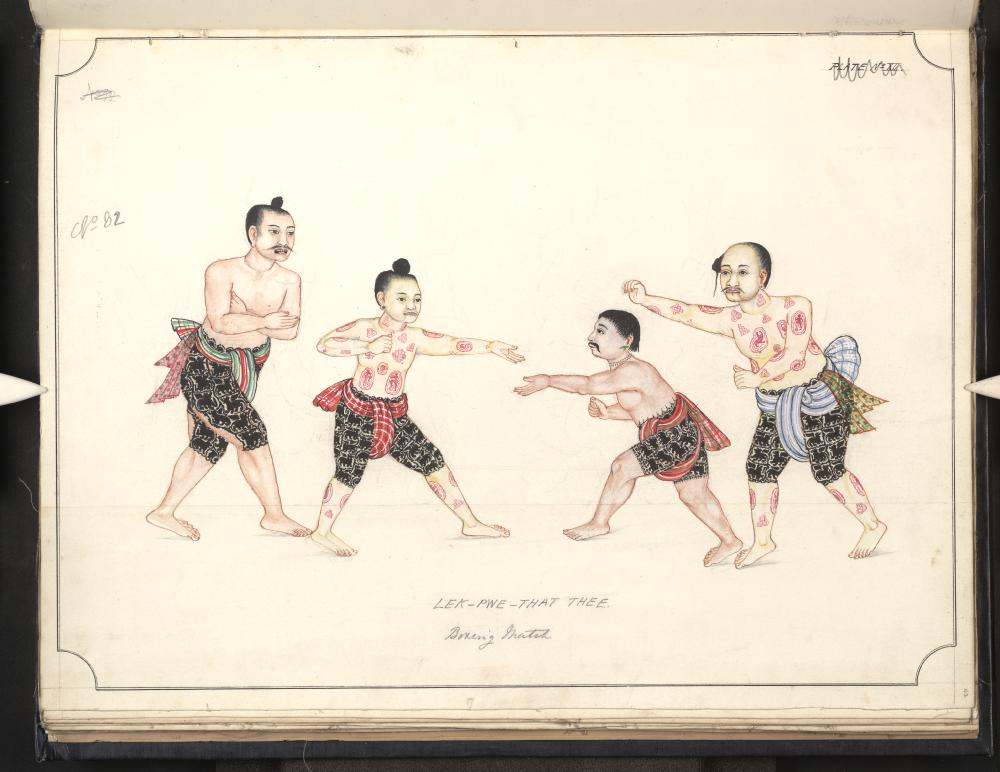
Watercolour painting from 1897 by an unknown Burmese artist depicting 19th century "LEK-PWE-THAT THEE" boxing match. All fighters wearing longyi and Htoe Kwin.

Tattooing was a painful procedure that could require extensive use of opium as a painkiller. A professional tattoo artist (မှင်ကြောင်ဆရာ or ကွင်းဆရာ) used a hnitkwasok, a long two-pronged brass or iron instrument with a 2 inches (51 mm) slit similar to a double-pointed pen, to pierce the skin. Completion of the tattoos took from 3 to 6 days. Nearly all Bamar men were tattooed at boyhood (between the ages of 8 and 14), from the waist to the knees. The tattooed patterns were ornamented pastiches of arabesques and animals and legendary creatures, including cats, monkeys, chinthe, among others. For the Bamar, tattooing of the waist, done with black pigment, was done before or soon after temporary ordination into monkhood, a major rite of passage for men. Other parts of the body were tattooed with red pigments. Among the Shan, blue or red pigments were especially popular, as were charms and cabalistic figures similar to yantra tattoos.

=== Htoe Kwin ===
The Htoe Kwin, also known as "Lethwei leg tattoos", is part of the fighting culture of Myanmar. During times of war, men would lift their longyis and expose their legs, displaying the tattoos and marking them as a renowned fighter. Throughout its history, Htoe Kwin tattooing (ထိုးကွင်း) was deeply rooted in Myanmar's Lethwei culture and masculine identity. From kings to commoners, these tattoos were exemplars of masculine strength and bravery. Htoe Kwin were tattooed to upper parts of the legs and covered the entire leg until just below the knee line. The very painful process was seen as a rite of passage, from boyhood to becoming a man. They would be made of circles or squares filled with cultural imagery drawn inside each circle depending on the region of the bearer. Traditional Lethwei warrior leg tattoos are a dying art for Burmese fighters.

Lethwei fighter Dave Leduc said that it is considered an important part of the process for the person receiving the Htoe Kwin to withstand the pain with stoicism. The entire process of tattooing both legs can last up to 24 hours.

“You endure this immense amount of pain,” Leduc describes, “Behind the knee, inner thighs, on top of the kneecap, it’s very painful. You shouldn’t show pain while getting tattooed, but keep a straight face as much as possible to show that you’re able to withstand the pain. It’s a rite of passage to become a man.”

== Tattooing among women ==
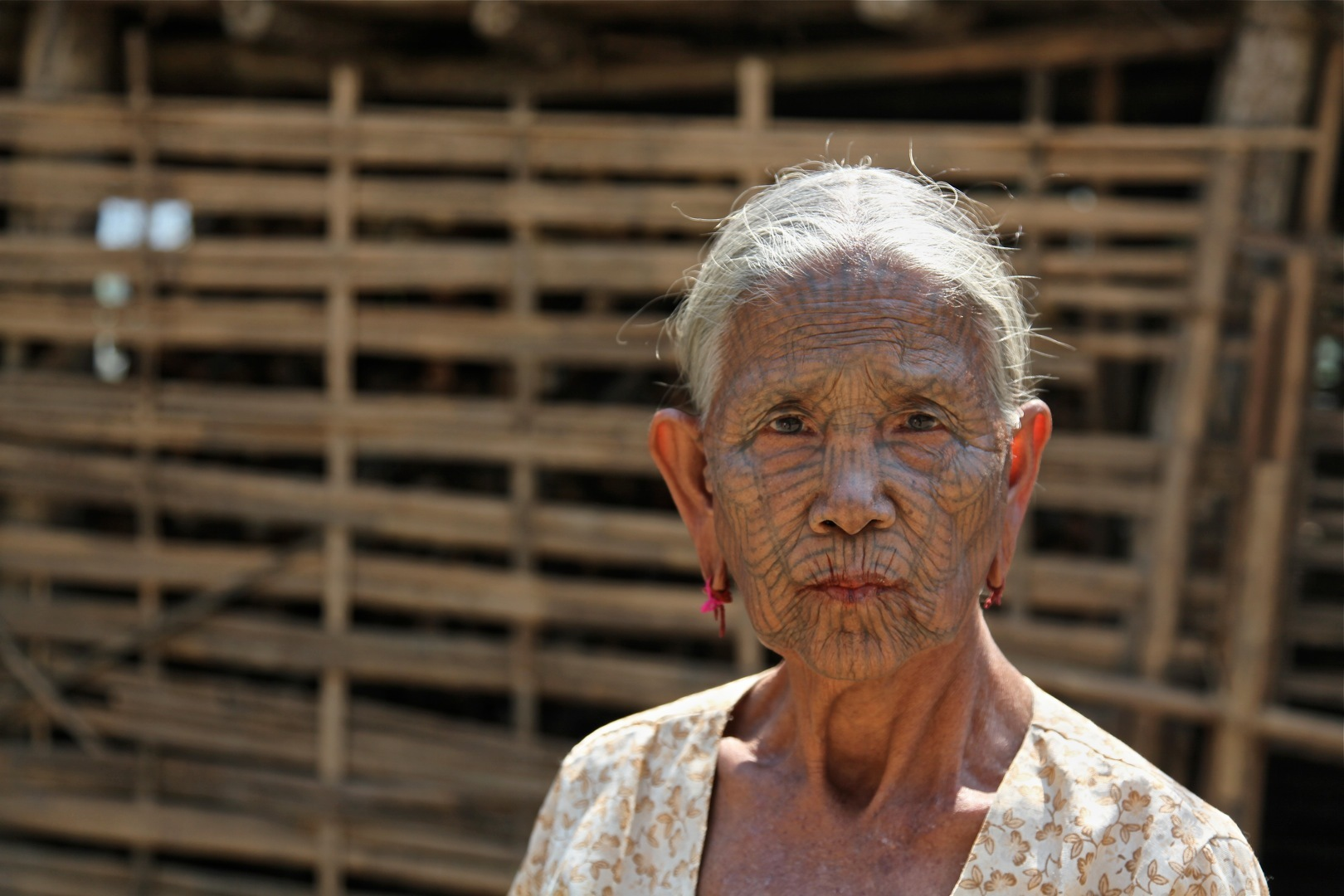
A tattooed Chin woman, 2009

Southern Chin women were also tattooed on their faces with closely set lines using blue pigments, ostensibly to discourage them from being kidnapped by invaders. Chin women were typically tattooed between the ages of 15 and 20. The practice has quickly disappeared, as it was banned in the 1960s by Burma's socialist regime and it was discouraged by Christian missionaries. Mro women wear tattoos in the form of small marks or stars on the cheek, forehead, or breast, which they associate with fertility.

== See also ==
- Yantra tattooing
- Culture of Myanmar
