= Longyi =

Cylindrical hip-wrap worn in Myanmar

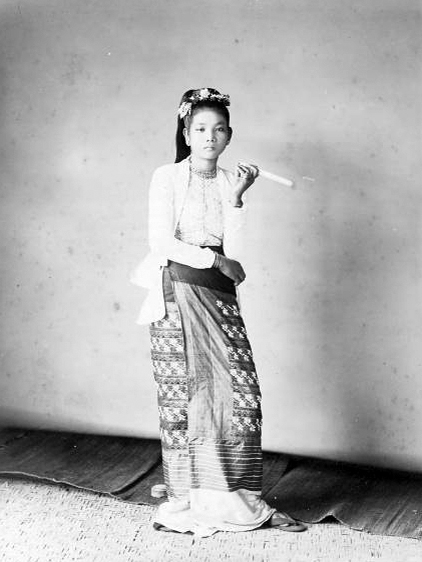
- Burmese woman in a longyi
- Type: Skirt
- Material: Silk, cotton
- Place of origin: Burma (Myanmar)

A longyi (Burmese: လုံချည်, MLCTS: lum hkyany; pronounced [lòʊɰ̃dʑì]) is a sheet of cloth widely worn in Myanmar (Burma). It is approximately 2 metres (6.6 ft) long and 80 centimetres (2.6 ft) wide. The cloth is often sewn into a cylindrical shape. It is worn around the waist, running to the feet, and held in place by folding fabric over without a knot. In ancient times, lethwei fighters would hitch it up (paso hkadaung kyaik) to compete. This folding technique is still being used in modern days when people play chinlone.

== History ==
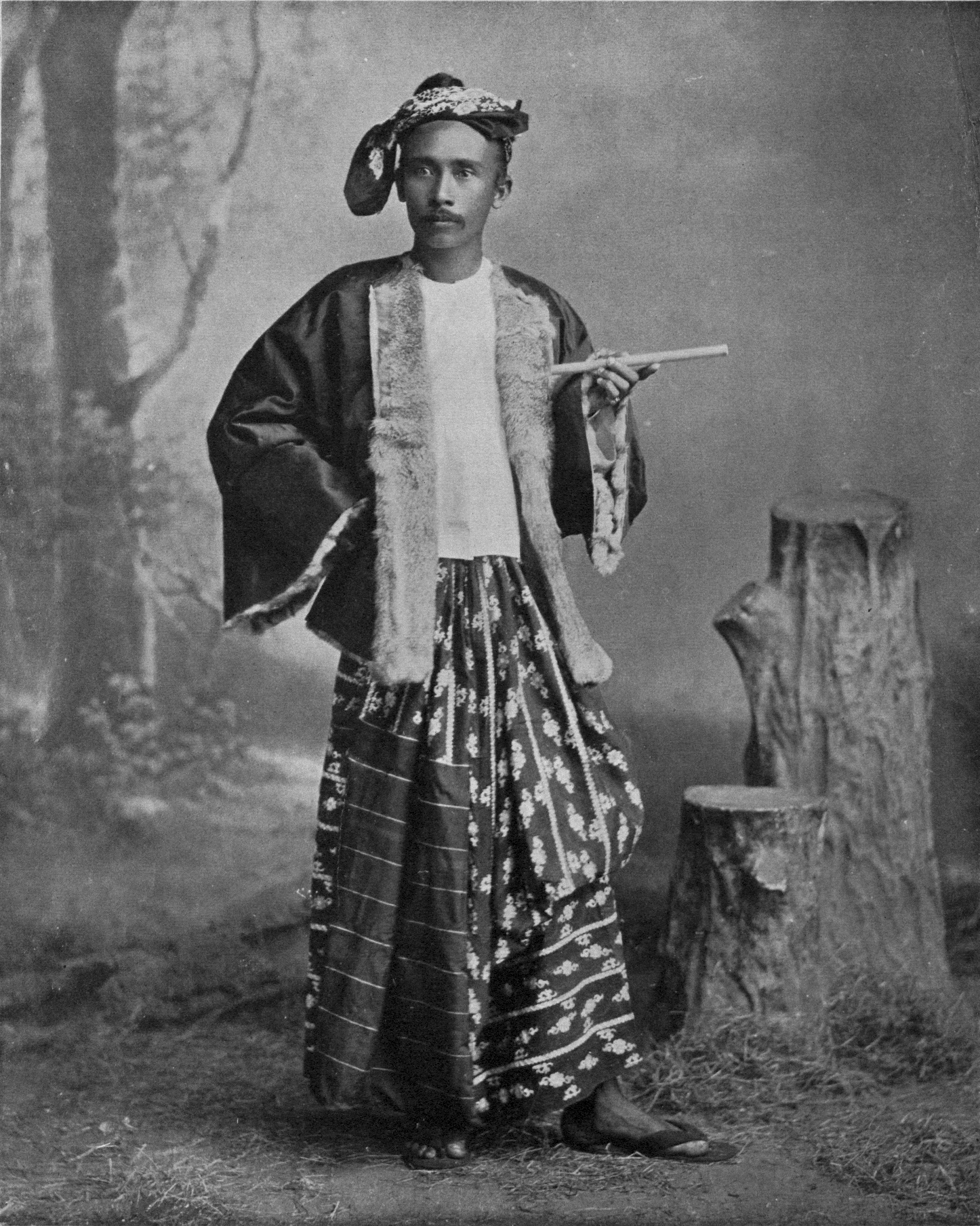
A man wearing taungshay paso in the late 1800s

The modern longyi, a single piece of cylindrical cloth, is a relatively recent introduction to Burma. It gained popularity during British colonial rule, effectively replacing the paso and htamein of precolonial times. The word longyi formerly referred to the sarong worn by Malay men.

In the precolonial era, men's pasos used to be a long piece of 30 feet (9.1 m) called taungshay paso (တောင်ရှည်ပုဆိုး) and unsewn. Alternately the htamein was a 4.5 feet (1.4 m) long piece of cloth open at the front to reveal the calves, with a dark strip of cotton or velvet sewn on the upper edge, a patterned sheet of cloth in the middle and a strip of red or white cloth sewn below, trailing on the bottom like a short train. Paso was commonly worn by men in 19th century Burma and Thailand. The amount of cloth in the paso was a sign of social status.

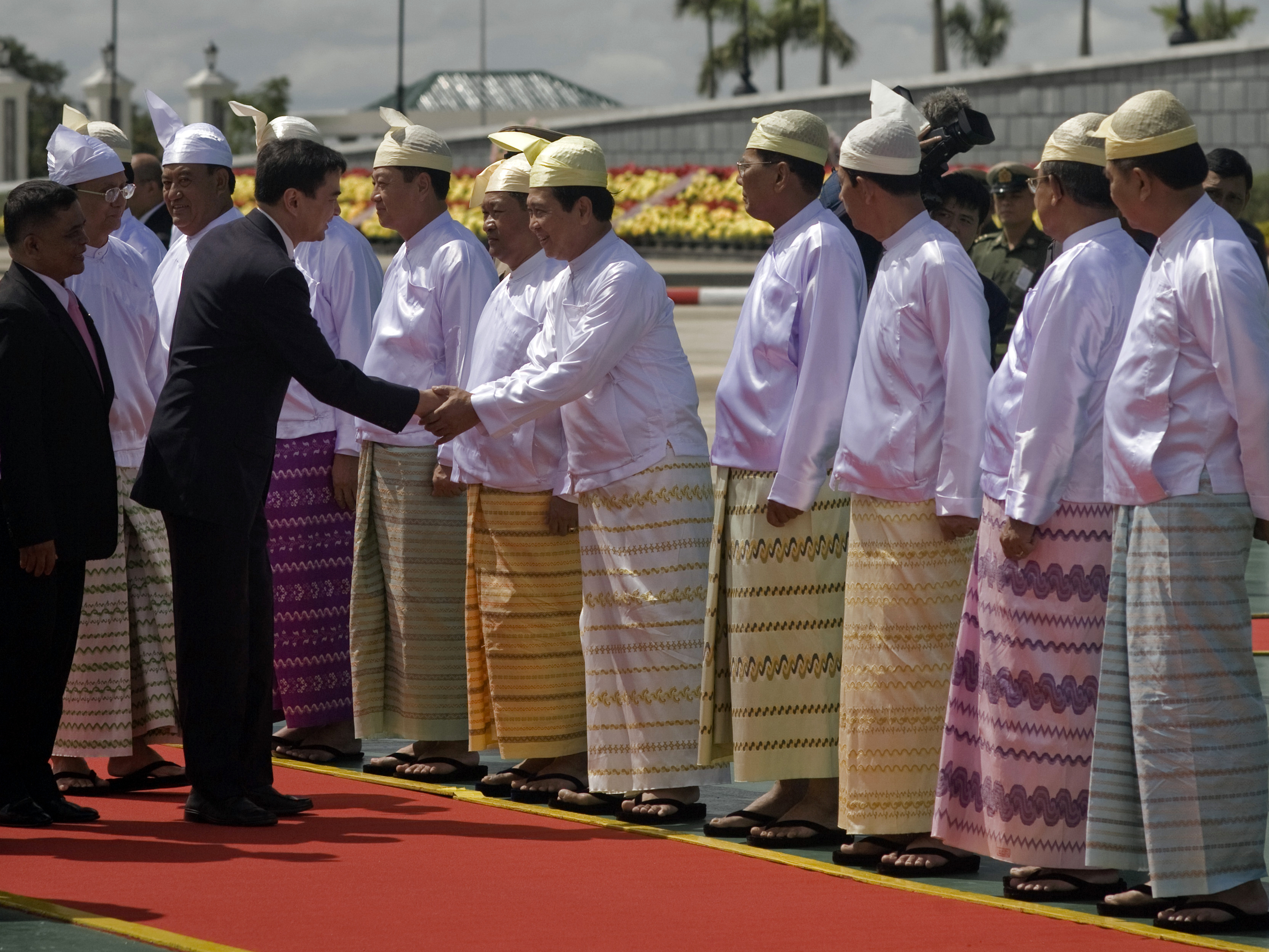
In an October 2010 state visit, Burmese State Peace and Development Council members greeted Thai Prime Minister Abhisit Vejjajiva in acheik-patterned longyi typically worn by women. Observers attributed this to yadaya practices.

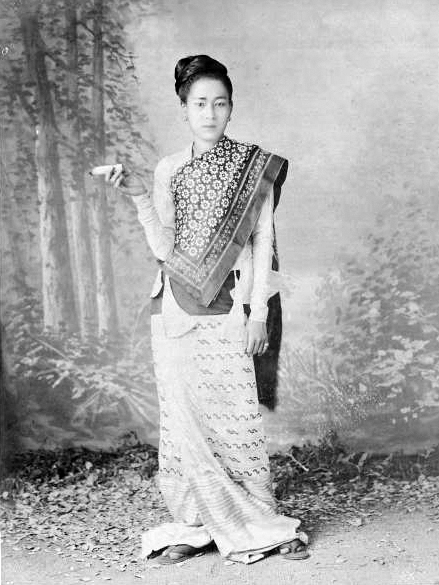
A woman dressed in the old htamein style prevalent until the 1900s

A western visitor to Rangoon in the 19th century wrote:

Nearly all the men are naked to the waist, or wear a small white open linen jacket, with a voluminous putso [paso] wound tightly round their loins and gathered into a great bundle or knot in front.

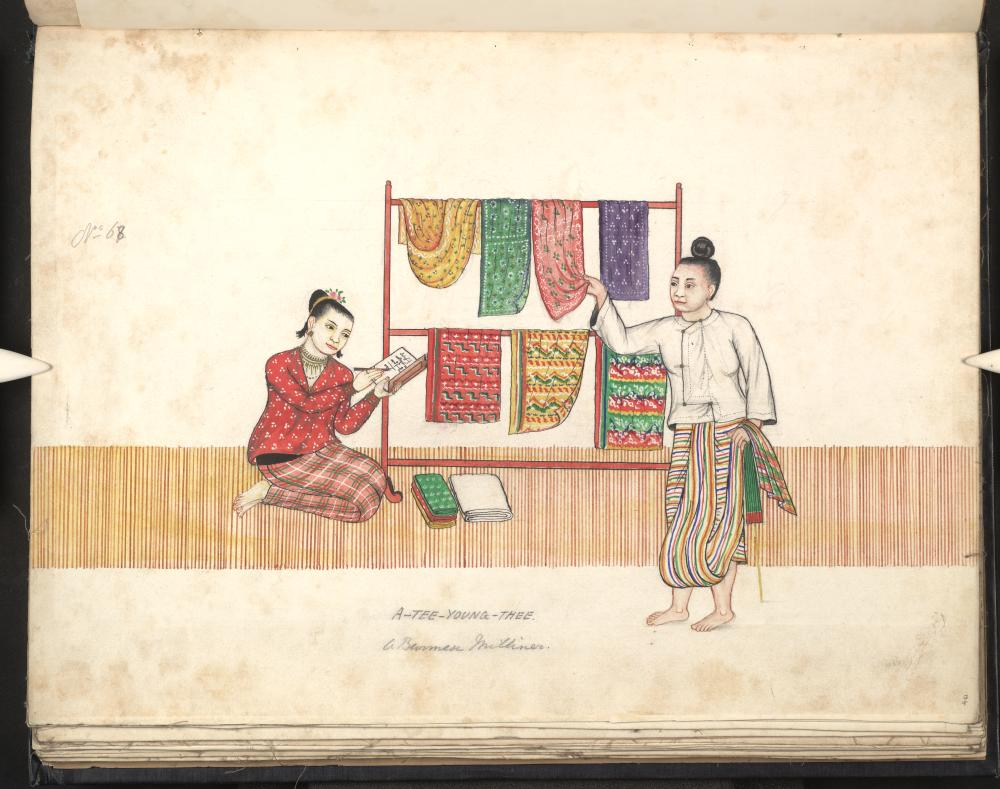
A 19th-century watercolor depicting longyi merchants

Visiting Amarapura, Henry Yule described the pasos and their equivalent for women, the htameins, as "the most important article of local production", employing a large proportion of the local population. The silk was imported from China. He wrote:

The putso piece is usually from nine to ten yards long. When made up for use the length of web is cut in halves, which are stitched together so as to give double width. It is girt round the waist without any fastening.

However, with the onset of colonial rule, Lower Burma and urban areas more readily adopted the longyi worn in the Malay and Indian style, which was considered more convenient to wear.

== Design and style ==
In Burma, longyis worn by males are called pahso (ပုဆိုး), while those worn by females are called htamein (ထဘီ, or htamain). Strictly speaking, they are not unisex attire, as the way they are worn, as well as the patterns and makeup are different between the genders.

Men wear the modern paso by making a fold on either side in front and tying them together at the waist just below the navel. Women, on the other hand, always have a three cubit one finger span length but again unsewn in the old days like men's. They are worn wrapped around with a single broad fold in front and the end tucked in on one side or folding back at the hip and tucked into the opposite side of the waist, usually topped with a fitted blouse worn just to the waistband.

Hemlines rise and fall as the fashion of the day dictates although they are unlikely to go up above the knee. Longyis are generally sold unsewn but nowadays they are available ready to wear; htameins may even be sewn like Western skirts. Untying and re-tying a longyi is often seen in public with both genders, women much more discreetly than men.

== Patterns and fabrics ==
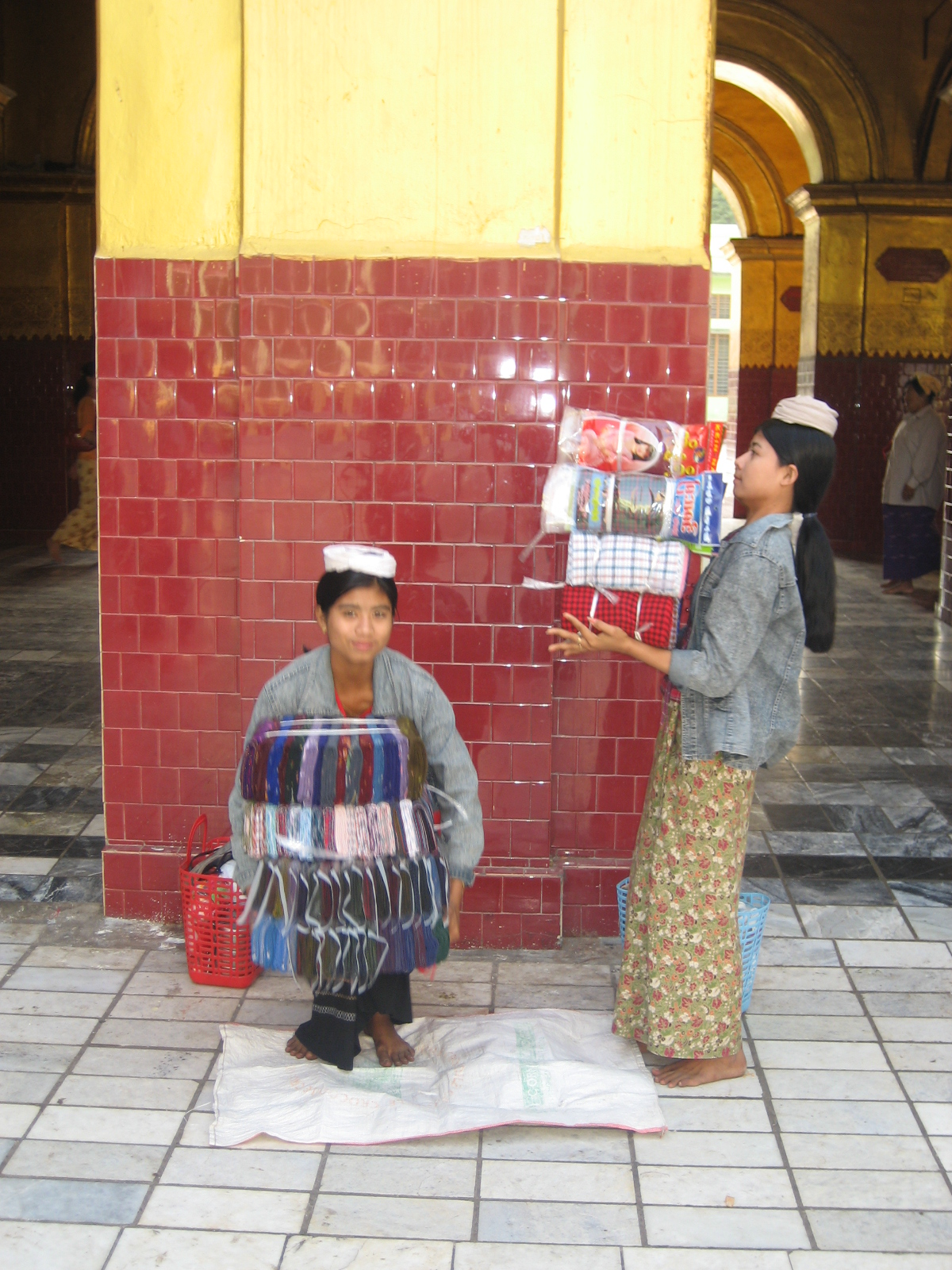
Longyis for sale, Mahamuni, Mandalay

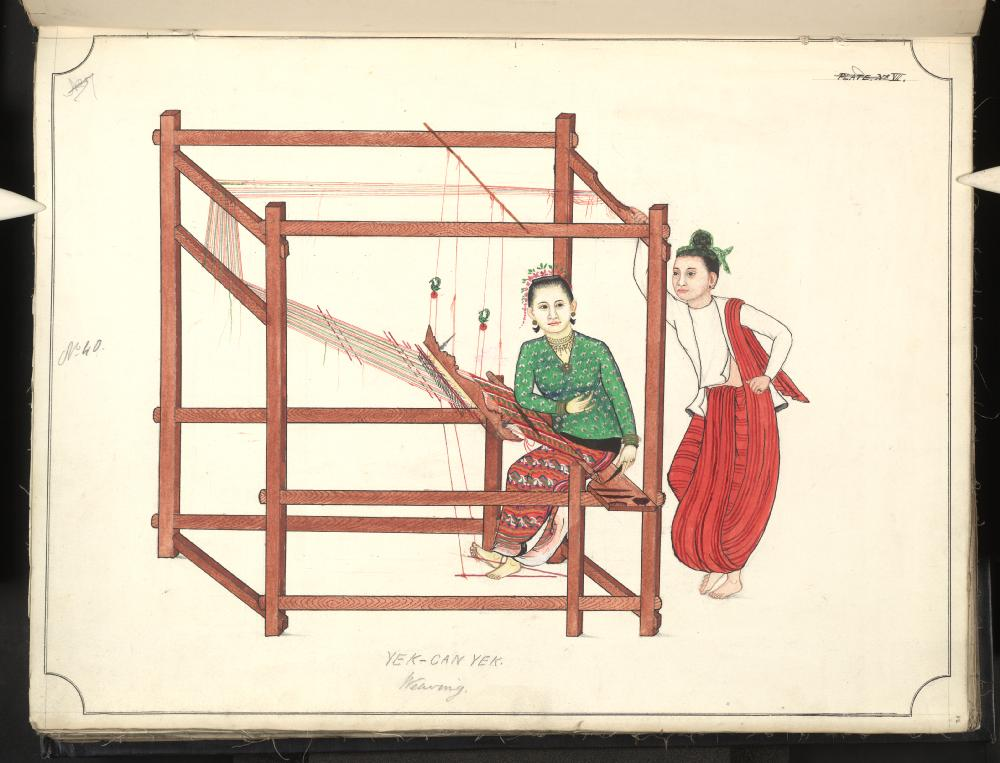
Burmese watercolour from the 19th century. A woman weaves a paso on a loom while a man, wearing a paso, looks on.

Men's pasos are generally stripes or checks apart from plain colours and may be worn upside down or inside out with no difference. Women's htameins have a black calico band called a htet sint (အထက်ဆင့်, lit. 'top band') for the waist; they wear more multi-coloured and floral patterns, too.

Cotton is the basic material but all sorts of fabrics, both imported and home-grown, may be made into longyis. Tootal, georgette, satin and crepe have been made into htameins. Indonesian batik, although very expensive, has been very popular for decades; outfits of batik (ပါတိတ်) of the same design, top and bottom, were very popular in the 1980s.

For ceremonial and special occasions wearers use their best silks; the most elaborate ones are known as acheik (အချိတ်, lit. 'hook'), a beautiful and intricate wave or houndstooth pattern in several colour combinations from the weavers of Amarapura. They are worn especially at weddings, almost invariably by the bride and groom in matching colours. The poor may keep aside some traditional silks for special occasions.

In ancient times, silks were generally worn by royalty and courtiers, the royal pasos and htameins richly embroidered with gold, silver, pearls and precious stones. Modern reproductions of these may be seen on the stage at zat pwès (theatrical performances).

Ethnic and regional weaves and patterns are common and widely produced. There are Rakhine longyi, Mon longyi, Kachin longyi, Inle longyi, Zin Mè (Chiang Mai) longyi, Yaw longyi, Seikkhun longyi, Dawei longyi, as well as several other examples.

Silk pasos, but not acheik, that men wear for special occasions are called Bangauk (Bangkok) paso. Kala (Indian) paso are often longer and are worn by taller people; Kaka zin refers to a broad check pattern of black, brown and white worn by Indian teashop owners. Mercerised longyis from India are popular as the fabric is more durable.

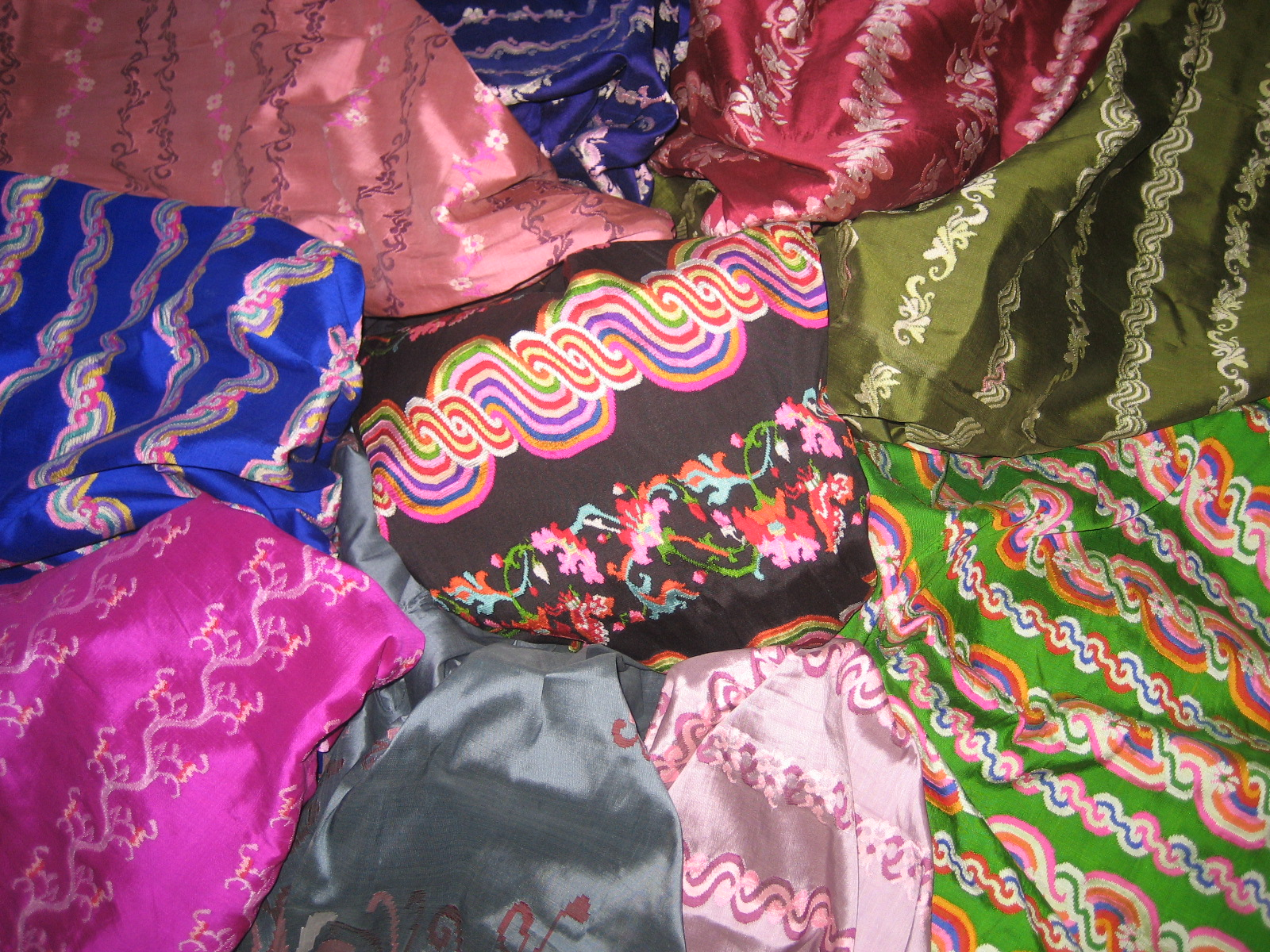
Acheik htameins, a private collection

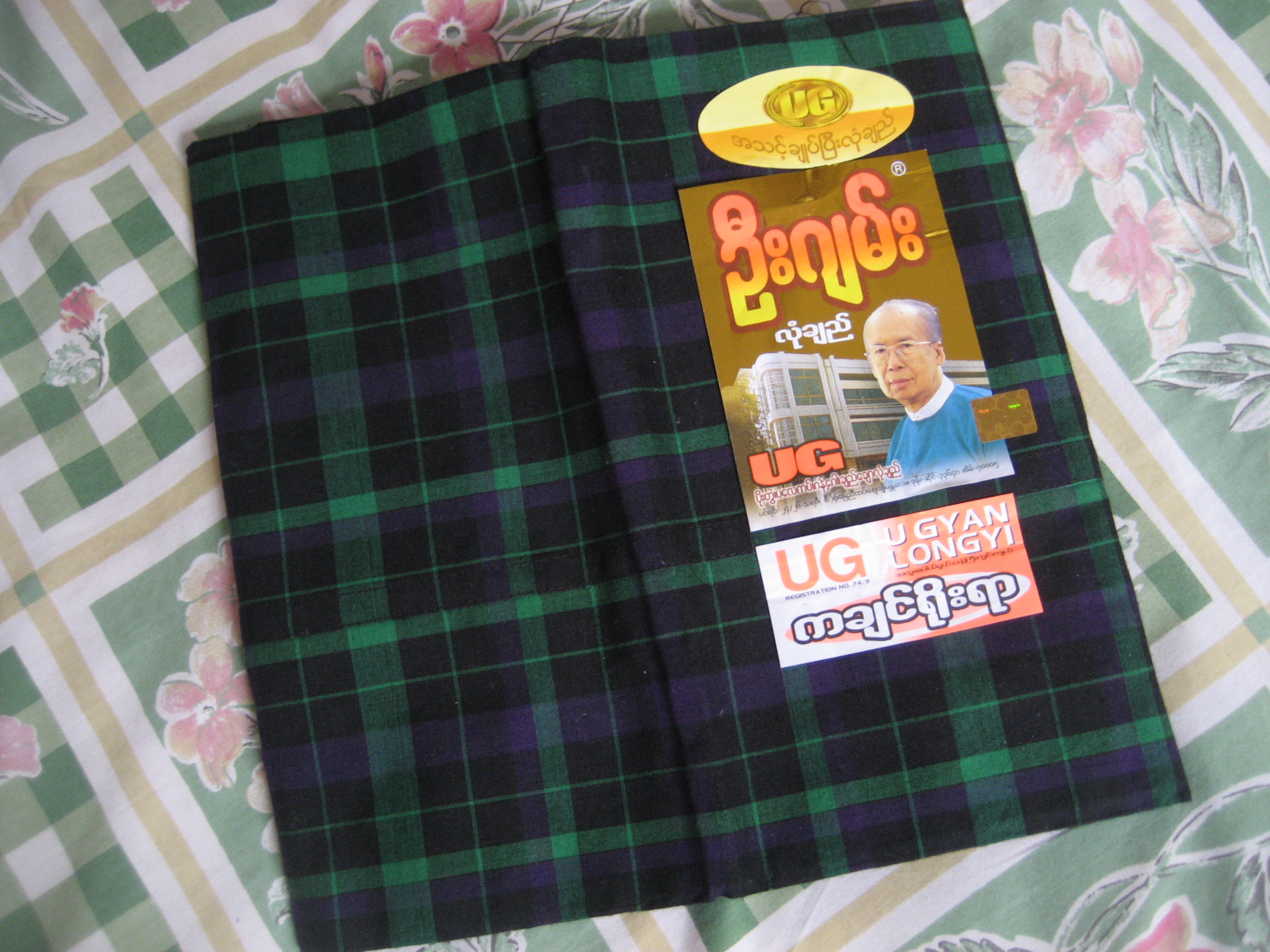
Kachin longyi with tartan design

== Versatility and convenience ==
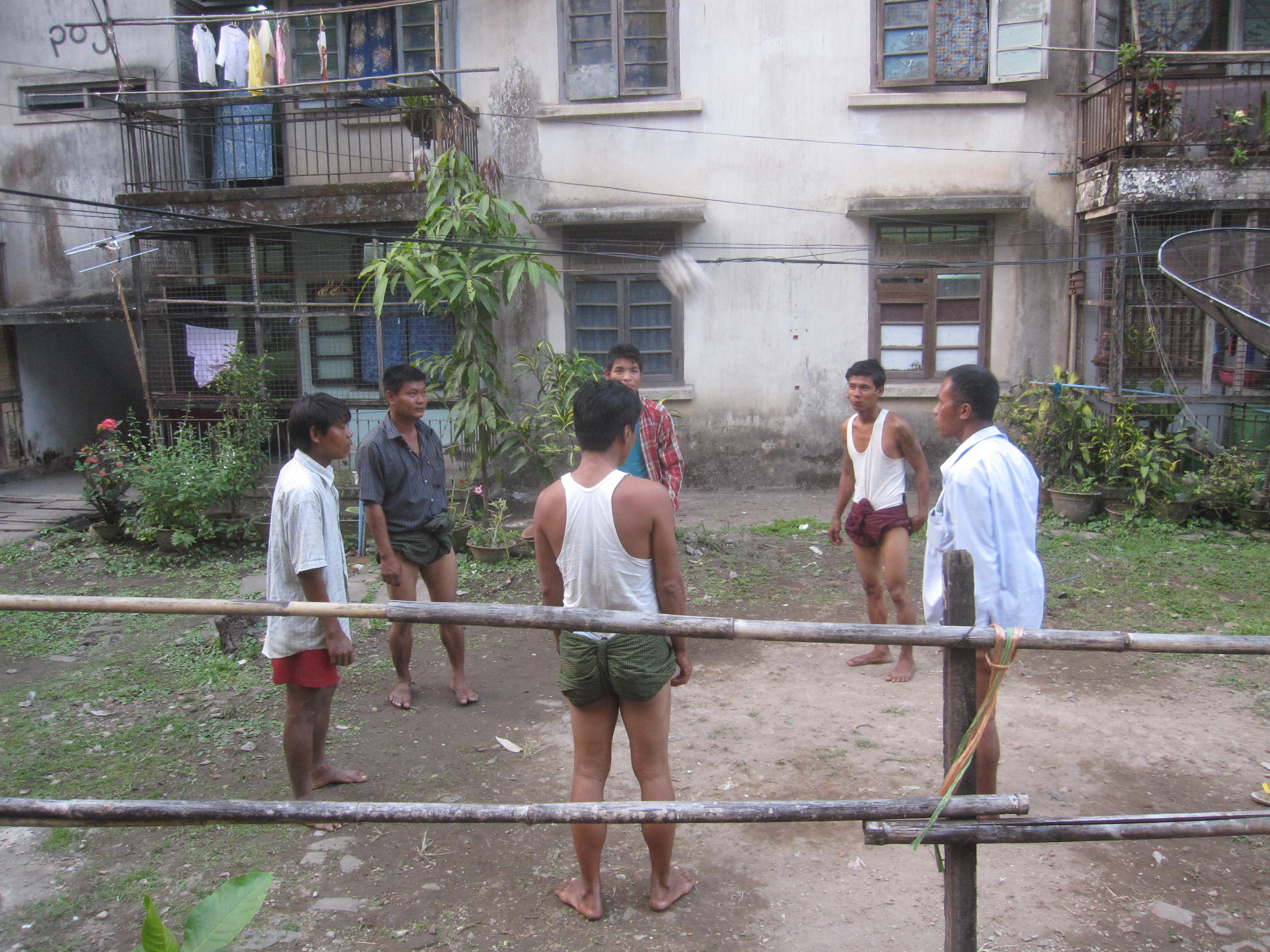
Burmese men with their longyi hitched up (paso hkadaung kyaik), playing chinlone in a Yangon neighbourhood

The longyi suits the climate as it allows some air to circulate and keeps cool in the hot sun. Silk is unique in keeping warm in the winter as well as cool in the summer.

The longyi is versatile. Men often tuck the lower portions of their pasos at the top by bunching it in the front, then passing them up between the legs around the back to the waist, known as paso hkadaung kyaik and, rather like the dhoti, usually for climbing and sporting activities instead of changing into shorts or trousers. Soldiers in ancient times wore their pasos in this manner either on their own or on top of a pair of trousers.

In rural areas, men are often seen with a folded paso on one shoulder either for use when bathing (yei lè — lit. 'water change' — longyi) or for use as a cushion for a carrying pole on the shoulder or a heavy load on the back. Women, when they bathe, simply wear their htamein higher by tucking it just under the arms to cover their breasts before removing the blouse; they may be seen using the htamein as a buoy in the river by trapping some air in and secured underneath by the hands. They use a man's paso or another piece of long fabric, rolled and coiled as a cushion on top of their heads to carry water pots, firewood, baskets and trays; it is the street hawker's customary way of carrying wares.

Changing is done simply by stepping into the new longyi and pulling it up, at the same time loosening and dropping the old one, or the new one can be pulled over from the head down. However, even when in private, women change without removing all their clothes. Instead, they will wear one htamein while changing into a new one. A woman may be seen pulling her htamein up bit by bit as she wades deeper and deeper into a river without getting it wet. It is merely a matter of lifting it up in the bathroom or in bed for that matter. Washing and ironing cannot be simpler as they are cylindrical pieces of cloth, easily hung, pressed, folded and stacked with a bare minimum use of wardrobe space.

=== Lethwei ===
In ancient times, traditionally Lethwei fighters would hitch up their longyi to compete in matches. Fighters would put it up as "shorts" called paso hkadaung kyaik to be able to use their legs and kick. Nowadays, in Lethwei matches fighters wear shorts which bear a flag reminiscent of the longyi of ancient days.

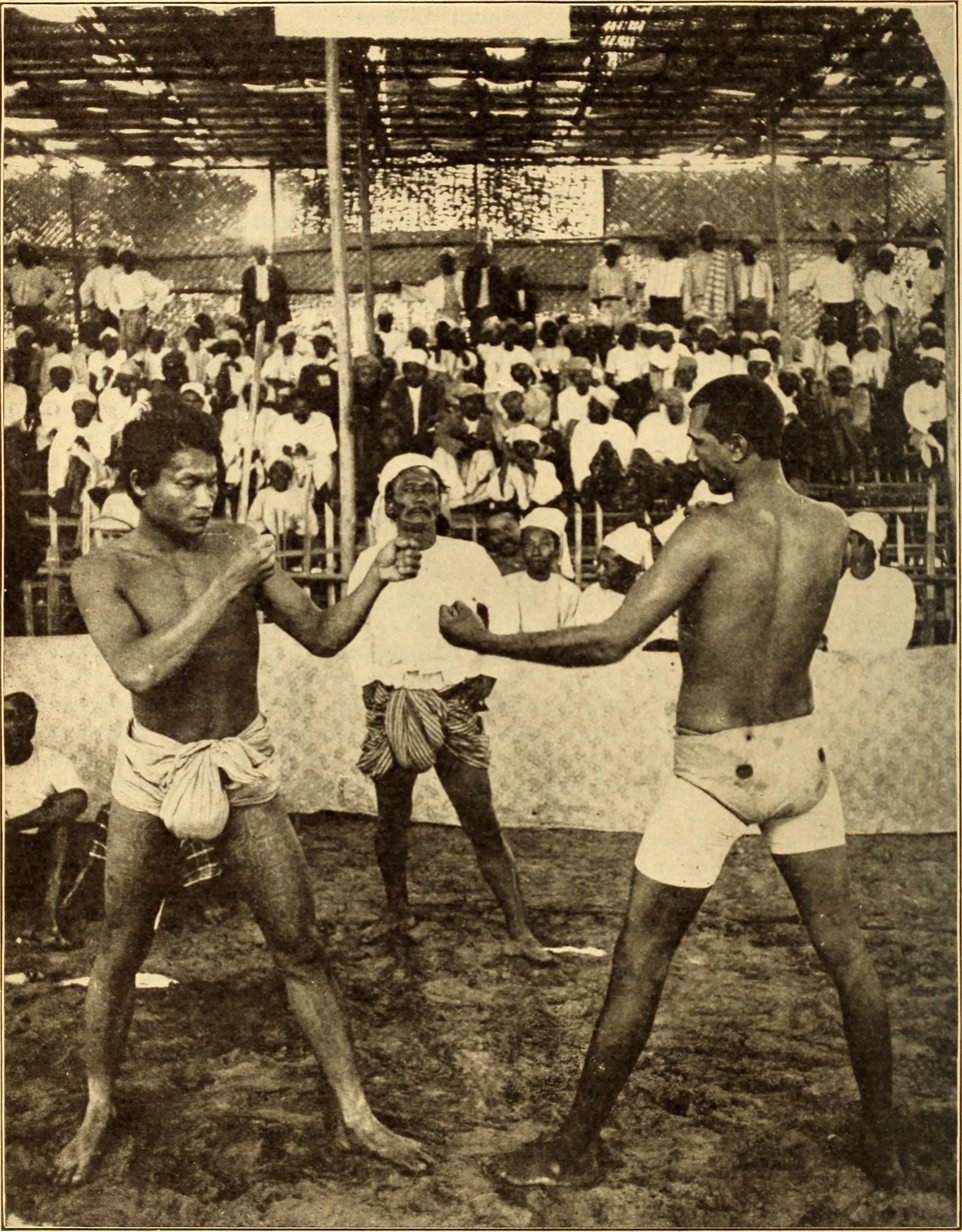
Late 19th century Lethwei match in Myanmar. The fighters on the left bears a Htoe Kwin tattoos and hitched up longyi (paso hkadaung kyaik).

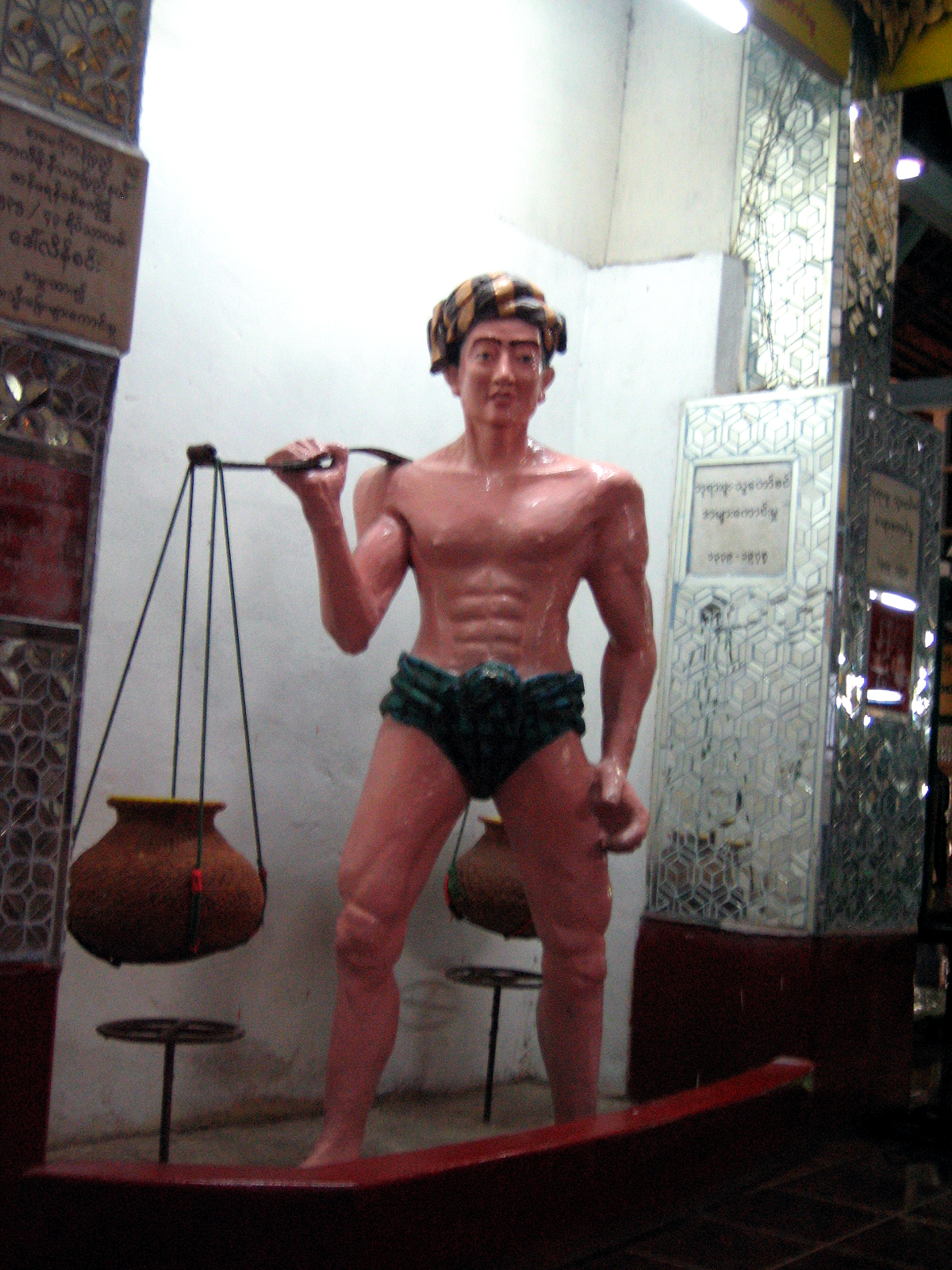
A statue wearing a paso hkadaung kyaik

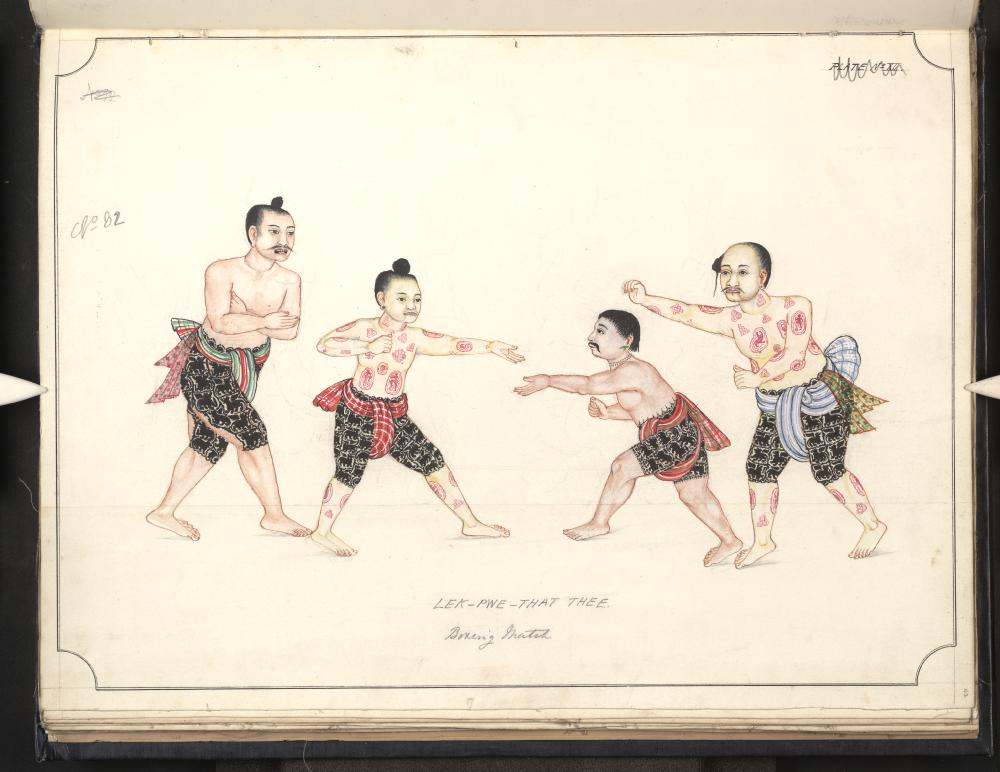
Watercolour painting from 1897 depicting a 19th-century boxing match. All fighters wear longyi and Htoe Kwin tattoos.

== See also ==
- Dhoti
