= Wat Bang Phra =

Buddhist temple in Nakhon Pathom province, Thailand

Coordinates: 13.8976°N 100.2126°E

- วัดบางพระ
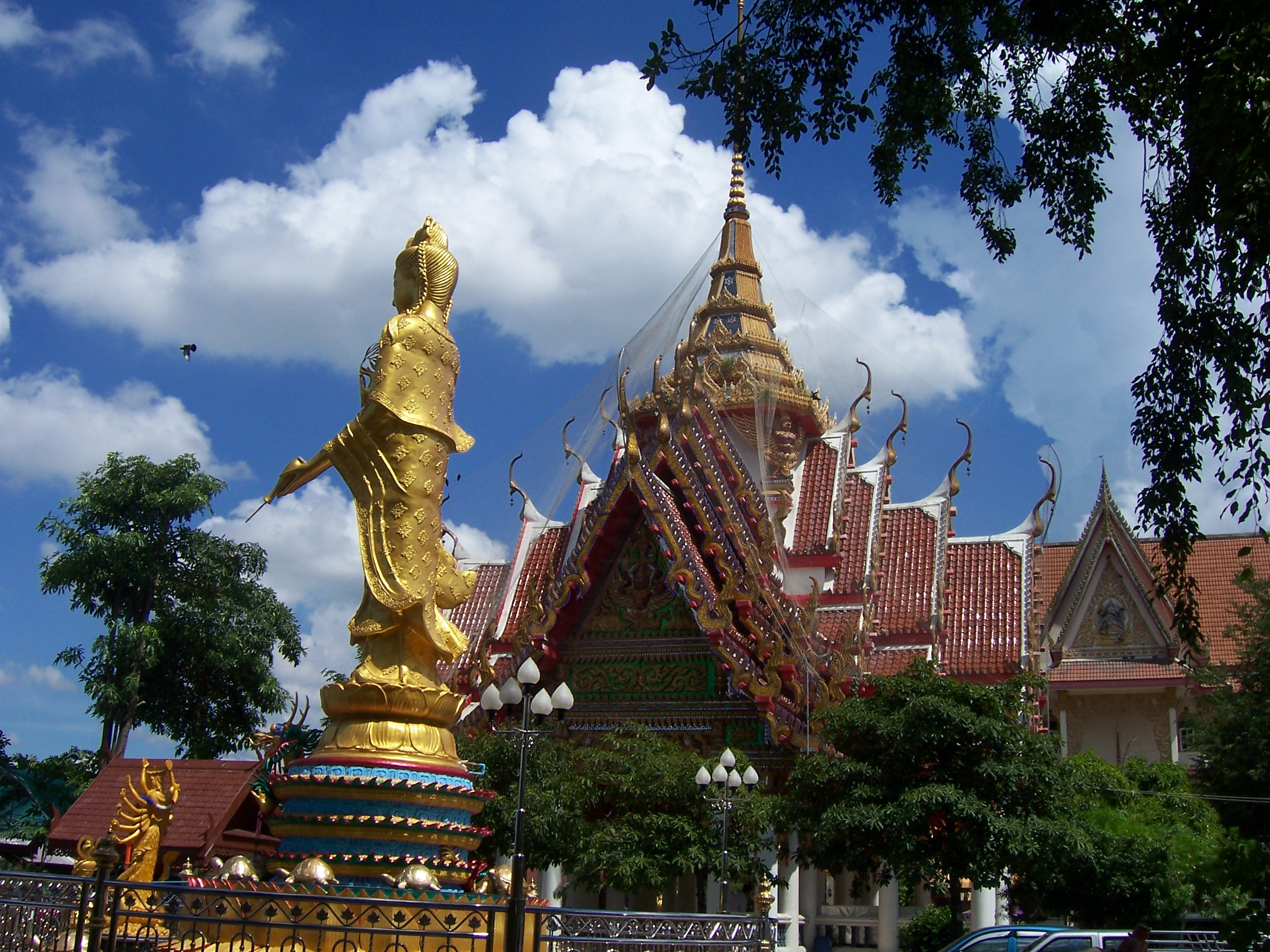
- Wat Bang Phra

- Location in Thailand

Religion
- Affiliation: Buddhism
- Sect: Theravāda
- District: Nakhon Chai Si district
- Province: Nakhon Pathom province
- Ecclesiastical or organisational status: Private temple (Wat Rat)
- Leadership: Phra Khru Anukul Phisan Kit (Sam-ang Paphassaro), abbot
- Status: Active

Location
- Location: No. 1, Moo 3, Rural Road NT 4014
- Country: Thailand

Architecture
- Established: Unknown

Wat Bang Phra (Thai: วัดบางพระ) is a Buddhist monastery (wat) in Nakhon Chaisi district, Nakhon Pathom Province, Thailand, about 50 km west of Bangkok. Wat Bang Phra translates into English as the "Monastery of the Riverbank Buddha Image," a reference to the temple's history as a spot where a revered Buddha image from Ayuthaya was recovered from a boat which sank in the Nakhon Chaisi River alongside where the monastery was founded.

== History ==
Wat Bang Phra dates to the late 18th century, just before the second fall of Ayutthaya. A small, elegant ordination chapel represents the only significant remains of the original monastery today. Inside sit two Buddha images, Luang Pho Sit Chaiyamongkon and Luang Pho Kai Sitmongkhon, which, according to legend, were being transported downriver from Ayutthaya to save them from plundering Burmese troops when the boat carrying them capsized. When the images were later pulled from the river, they were kept in the monastery that came to be known as Wat Bang Phra. The murals inside the original ordination hall demonstrate craftsmanship from the reigns of Kings Rama III and Rama IV. Former abbot Phra Udom Prachanart, more commonly known as Luang Phor Pern, was a famous meditation monk well known for his potent incantations and his knowledge of the body of Buddhist canons (Tripitaka) and most of all his mastery of protective sak yant (sacred Thai tattoos).

Luang Phor Pern ordained as a monk at Wat Bang Phra at the age of 25 and studied with abbot Luang Pu Him Inthasoto, an accomplished sak yant master. Even though Luang Phor Pern had never been tattooed himself (and never would be), he took up the sacred art at Luang Pu Him's feet and carried on the tradition after Luang Pu Him died four years later.

In 1953, feeling he needed further withdrawal, renunciation and solitary meditation, wandered in the forests of a remote area of Kanchanaburi Province on the Myanmar-Thailand border. Villagers in the area were beleaguered by wild tigers that had mauled or killed several locals. After Luang Phor Pern learned of the villagers’ predicament, he offered katha (incantations) and sak yant to protect them. He taught them that tiger yantras, in particular, could fend off attacks. From that point forward, no one who received the monk's protection was ever attacked by a tiger or other wild animal, earning Luang Phor Pern a powerful reputation as a master of incantations and tattoos.

Returning to Wat Bang Phra many years later, he was made abbot used temple donations to build a bridge over the adjacent river so that farmers could more easily bring their crops to market in Nakhon Chaisi or beyond, and constructed the local public hospital that today bears his name. As his reputation for wisdom and loving kindness grew, thousands of Thais travelled to Wat Bang Phra to receive the blessings of the great monk and to become his lifelong disciples. Many received sak yant from the abbot and the monks he assiduously trained. By the time Luang Phor Pern died in 2002 at the age of 79, he had become one of Thailand's most well-known and beloved monastics. Because of Luang Phor Pern's association with the border tiger legend, devotional images of the late monk today often depict him meditating on the back of a tiger.

== Daily tattooing ==
The temple is also known for the daily tattoos or Sak Yants given by the monks that live there, and especially for the Wai Khru festival held on the temple grounds once a year during March, when disciples gather to pay respect to the spirit of Luang Pho Poen. The power of any amulet or tattoo decreases with time, so, to re-empower tattoos each year, Sak Yant masters celebrate with their disciples the Wai Khru (Wai Khru meaning to pay homage to one's teacher). On this day devotees gather in the parlours of their Sak Yant masters to honor them and get their tattoos blessed and re-empowered.

There are many articles found on the internet regarding the tattoo festival but very little information found regarding the day-to-day operations of the temple as described below.

The process of receiving a tattoo from the monks at Wat Bang Phra outside of the events surrounding the tattoo festival are as follows:

=== Before the tattoo ===
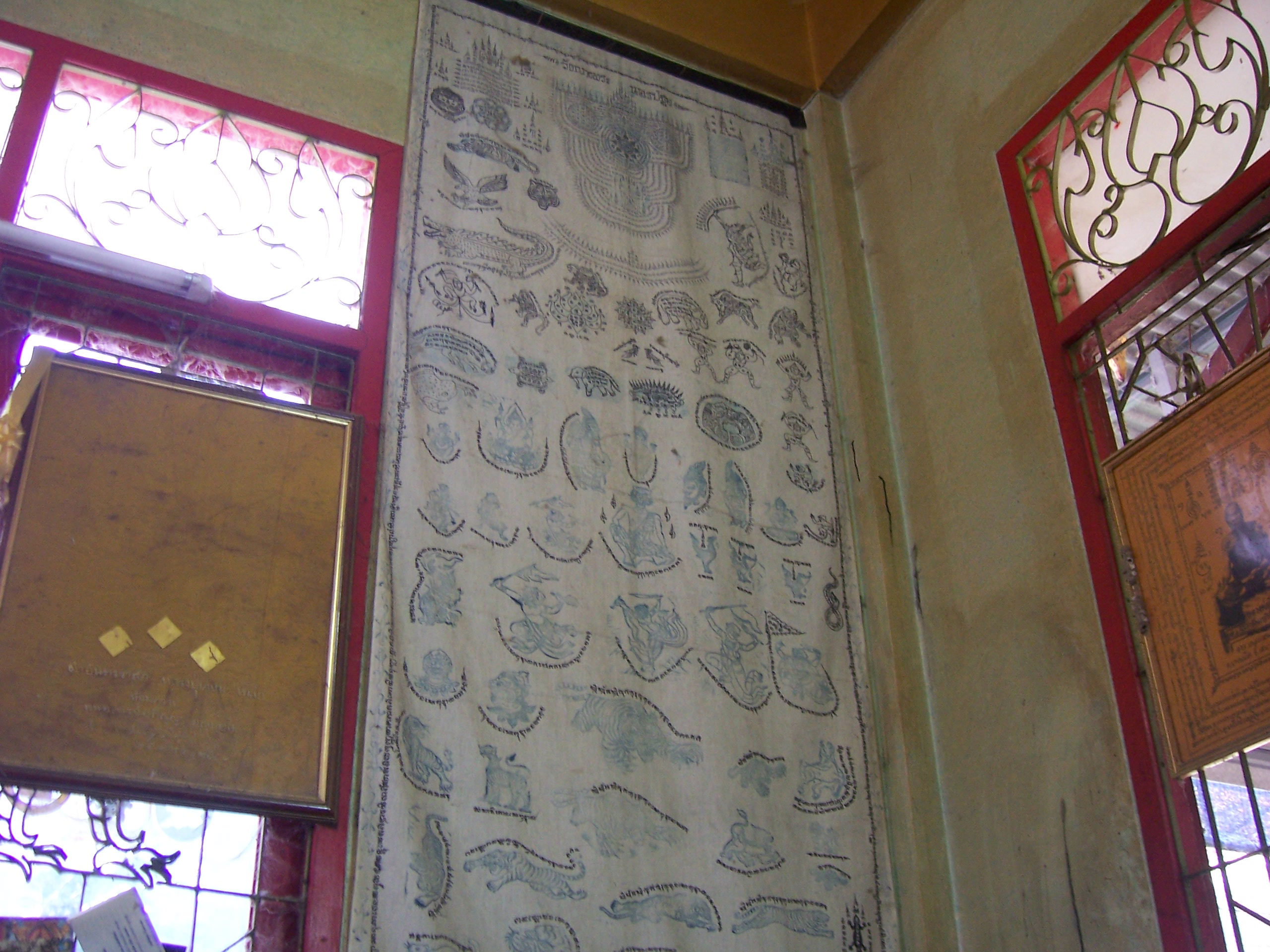
Tattoo Selections on the temple wall

A person wanting a tattoo will arrive at the temple around 8:00 AM. Before entering the temple, the person will purchase flowers, cigarettes (of Luang Phor Pern's favorite brand), and incense (150 Baht as of Nov 2022) as an offering to Buddha and to support the Wat. These offerings are then recycled back into the place where purchased and the money used for up-keep for the Wat. Upon removing your shoes and entering the Wat, a person will sit down in line. A number will be given to you after making your offering and you will be called up in this order. The offerings are kept in the center of the room. The tattoos are done in groups of about 20 people. When the previous group is complete, the monk blesses the next batch of offerings observed to be between 18 and 30.

=== Tattoo options ===
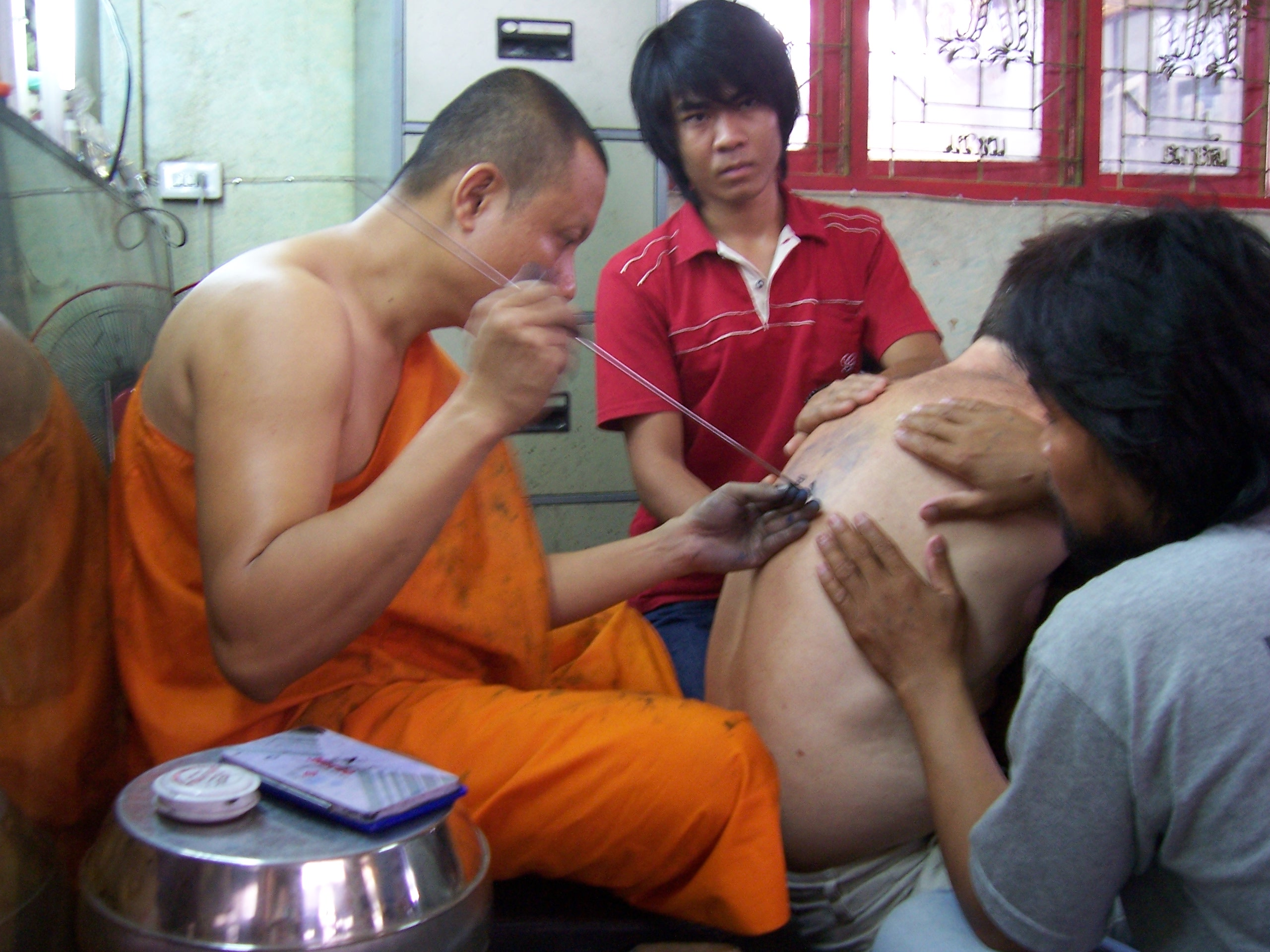
Luang Pi Nunn tattooing at Wat Bang Phra

Generally speaking, one does not choose the tattoo acquired. The first tattoo is almost always the "Gao Yord" or "Nine Spires" and is done in the center of the upper back, extending slightly onto the neck. The second is an extension, known as the "Yeesib Gao Yord" or "Twenty Nine Spires," and goes across the shoulders to cover the entire upper back. After the first two tattoos, it is generally considered that one's body has been blessed and opened to receive the power of the subsequent tattoos. These tattoos are whatever the attending monk believes is most beneficial to you and your spirit.

=== Daily tattooing (Modern) ===
Most of the tattoos given at Wat Bang Phra in the modern era are done with a standard electric tattoo gun. The needles are changed between each tattooing, and for the most common tattoos (e.g., Gao Yord and Yeesib Gao Yord), there are stencils applied before tattooing. The traditional custom of two people staying behind after their tattoo to hold down the next and help stretch the skin and keep the surface flat is still observed. The ink used is standard black tattoo ink.

=== Daily tattooing (Traditional) ===
Right before reaching the monk, the people next in line to the one being tattooed will assist the monk with holding the one receiving the tattoo still. The monk uses a single long thin needle about 18 inches in length and about four millimeters in width. The tip of the spike is split into two (like a split cane), so that each stab of the spike produces two dots of ink in the skin. There are about 8 of these needles in a pot of a type of cleaning solution. Sometimes the monk will sharpen the needle with fine grade sandpaper before beginning. The monk will then select from several different rubber templates with the design of choice. He will apply the template to ink and then press it on to the recipients back to transfer the design. When ready to begin, he will dip the tip of the needle into a mix of oil, probably palm oil, Chinese charcoal ink, and possibly snake venom. He then begins to trace the pattern. The typical tattoo takes about 3,000 strikes to complete. The monk dips the needle into the ink about every 30 seconds. When complete, he blesses the tattoo and blows a sacred Kata (Ghata) on it to infuse it with power. For men, the monk uses the charcoal ink. For women he uses a transparent ink and will use a glove in order to not touch the female body.

== Health ==
The sanitation of the needle and ink are unknown. Receiving a tattoo at the Wat Bang Phra temple potentially exposes a person to HIV, Hepatitis B, or Hepatitis C. There are approximately 580,000 people living with AIDS in Thailand. However, according to the "UNAIDS 2006 Report on the Global AIDS Epidemic" there are no recorded cases of contracting HIV or AIDS from a tattoo needle due to the absence of a reservoir inside the needle containing enough blood to deliver the virus into the body to pass infection.

== See also ==
- Sak Yant
