= Acheik =

Burmese textile pattern

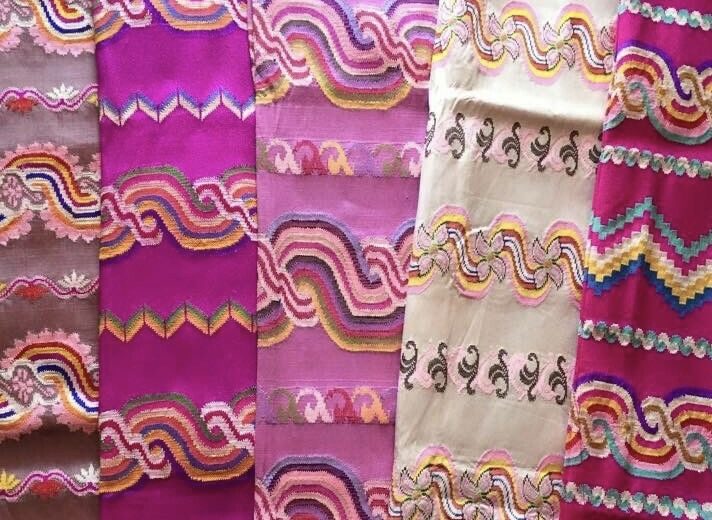
Acheik

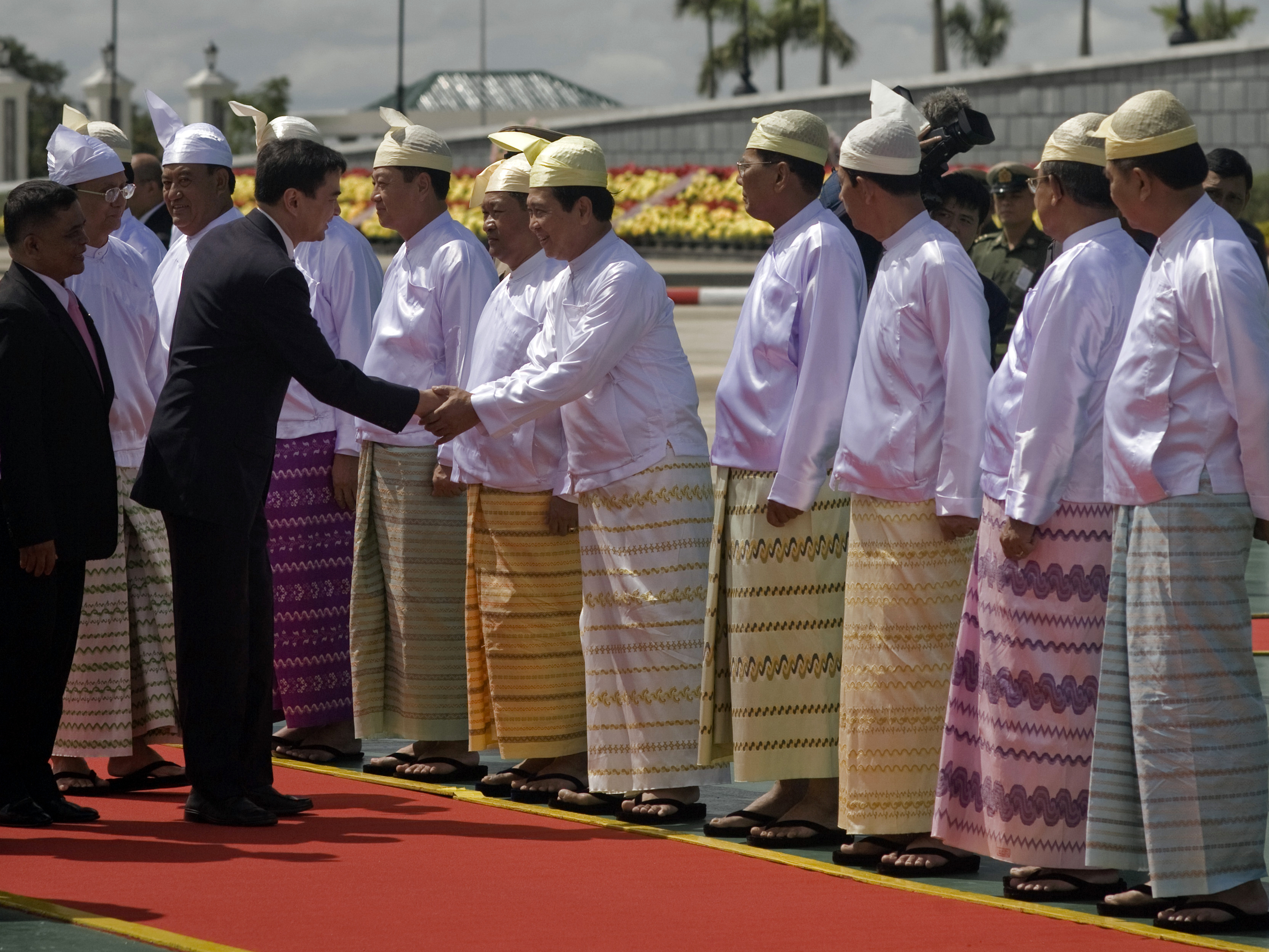
Members of Myanmar's State Peace and Development Council dressed in acheik longyi

Acheik (အချိတ်; [ʔət͡ɕʰeɪʔ]) or luntaya acheik (လွန်းတစ်ရာအချိတ်; lit. 'hundred shuttle acheik'), is the name of the indigenous Burmese textile pattern. It features intricate waves interwoven with bands of horizontal stripes, embellished with arabesque designs. Luntaya (လွန်းတစ်ရာ; [lʊ́ɴtəjà]), which literally means a "hundred shuttles," refers to the time-consuming, expensive, and complex process of weaving this pattern, which requires using 50 to 200 individual shuttles, each wound with a different color of silk. The weaving is labor-intensive, requiring at least two weavers to manipulate the shuttles to achieve the interwoven wave-like patterns.

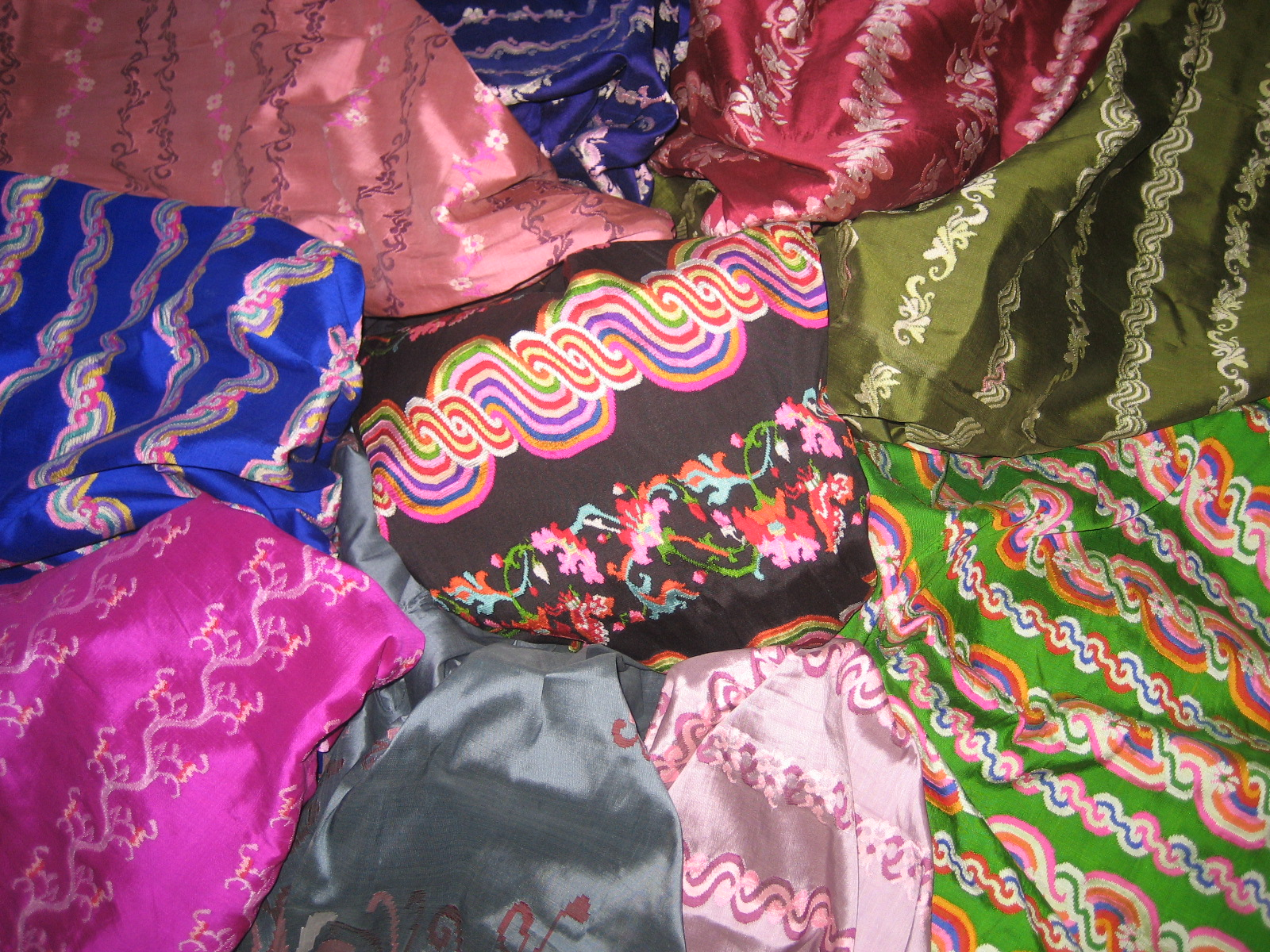
Assortment of female acheik htamein (sarongs).

Acheik is most commonly used as a textile for male paso or female htamein. The color palettes used in acheik incorporate a bold array of contrasting shades in a similar color range to create a shimmering trompe-l'œil effect. Designs for men feature simpler zig-zag, cable and interlocking lappet motifs, while those for women interweave undulating waves with arabesque embellishments such as floral motifs or creepers.

== Production ==
The towns of Amarapura and Wundwin remain major domestic centers of traditional acheik weaving, although in recent years, cheaper factory-produced imitations from China and India have significantly disrupted Myanmar's traditional cottage industry.

== Origins ==
Acheik weaving originates in Amarapura, near the Pahtodawgyi pagoda. The name acheik may derive from the name of the quarter in which the weavers lived, Letcheik Row (လက်ချိတ်တန်း); the term itself was previously called waik (ဝိုက်), referring to the woven zig-zag pattern.

While some sources claim that the acheik pattern was introduced by Manipuri weavers during the late 1700s, there are no comparable Manipuri textiles that resemble acheik. The wave-like patterns may have in fact been inspired by Neolithic motifs and natural phenomena (i.e., waves, clouds, indigenous flora and fauna). Acheik-type designs are found on pottery dating back to the Pyu city states (400s-900s CE), as well as in temple wall paintings dating back to the Bagan Kingdom era (1000s-1200s CE). Tributary gifts bestowed to the Burmese royal court may also have provided an additional source of inspiration. The textile became popular during the Konbaung dynasty, during which sumptuary laws regulated who could wear acheik clothing. The acheik pattern was exclusively worn by members of the royal court, officials, and their entourages.

== See also ==
- Burmese clothing
