= Yantra tattooing =

Style of tattooing popular in Thailand, Cambodia, Laos, and Myanmar

Yantra tattooing or Sak Yant (Khmer: សាក់យ័ន្ត) (Thai: สักยันต์) (Lao: ສັກຢັນ) is a tattoo practice originating in the Khmer Empire around the ninth century, based on indigenous Mainland Southeast Asian animist tattooing practices, dating back as far as 2,500 BCE, with designs influenced by Indian yantras. The practice is now common in Cambodia, Laos, Thailand, and parts of Burma. The geometrical, animal and deity designs written in various ancient scripts accompanied by Pali, Khmer, or Northern Thai phrases are said to offer power, protection, fortune, charisma and other benefits for the bearer.

== Etymology ==
Sak Yant refers to the piercing of the skin with a long needle (sak) and to sacred geometry (yant), which can comprise text or/and pictures. During the ritual of drawing or tattooing sacred geometry, spirits are transferred into the design: "Spiritual tattooing functions as the bridge or instrument that connects the tattoo wearer with gods or 'wild spirits' in the spiritual realm in order to help him/her".

Sak (សាក់) meaning "tattoo" is a native Khmer term originating from the Proto Mon-Khmer root word *cɔkʔ meaning “to prick”. Chuon Nath’s 1967 dictionary maintains the indigenous origin of the word, displaying that sak is not a loanword derived from Sanskrit or Pali. As the practice of yantra tattooing filtered into neighboring kingdoms from the Khmer Empire, the word sak was adopted into Thai and Lao carrying the same meaning of "tattoo". Sak is also a Proto-Tai word (*sakᴰ) meaning "one or so; any", this word has evolved into various different meanings in Thai, however linguists correlate this Proto-Tai root with a quantitative related word that is not related to the word sak meaning "tattoo". Meanwhile, The word yantra (यन्त्र) derives from the Sanskrit root yam (to hold, to sustain) and tra (instrument or tool). A yantra is thus a “sacred instrument,” a device designed to contain, channel, and concentrate energy. While often depicted as a geometrical diagram on paper, metal, or stone, the essence of yantra is far subtler: it is a pattern that links the human mind to cosmic principles.

== History ==
Tattoos believed to offer protection and other benefits have been recorded everywhere throughout both mainland Southeast Asia and as far south as Indonesia and the Philippines. Chinese records show that in the first millennium CE and earlier, tattooing was common among non-Han "barbarian" peoples as far north as the Yangzi River. Sak Yant originates from a synthesis of Southeast Asian animistic beliefs with Hindu-Buddhist beliefs and practices, with foundational geometric yantras going back to ancient India. Tattoos of yantra designs were believed to hold magic power, and were used much like the kolam tattoos of India. For these people, religion is closely tied to the notion of magic, health, and good fortune. These designs, originally serving as meditation tools, were integrated into body modification during the Khmer Empire circa the ninth century. The practice spread across Cambodia, Thailand, and Laos, where it was, and continues to be, defined by strict rules intended to maintain the tattoos’ spiritual power.

In Cambodia, the Khmer script is used. Yantra entered Thailand through the Khmers and in central Thailand, the Khom script, derived from Khmer script, is used. While in northern Thailand yantra tattoos may use Shan, northern Thai, or Tai Lu scripts, and in Laos the Lao Tham script is employed.

== Meaning ==
Yantra tattoos are believed to be magic and bestow mystical powers, protection, or good luck. There are three main effects of a yantra tattoo. One is that which benefits the wearer, such as making them more eloquent. Another is that of protection and to ward off evil and hardship. This is commonly used by military personnel, police, taxi drivers, gangsters, and others in perceived dangerous professions. Another type is that which affects people around the wearer, such as invoking fear. The tattoo only confers its powers so long as the bearer observes certain rules and taboos, such as abstaining from a certain type of food.

Sak yant designs are also applied to many other media, such as cloth or metal, and placed in one's house, place of worship, or vehicle as a means of protection from danger or illness, to increase wealth, and to attract lovers. In recent years Hollywood celebrities such as Angelina Jolie, whose tattoos were inked by Ajahn Noo Ganpai with Old Khmer script Sak yant in Thailand, have made them popular among women. Angelina Jolie got a yantra tattoo of a Bengal tiger in 2004 to celebrate acquiring Cambodian citizenship.

== Gallery ==
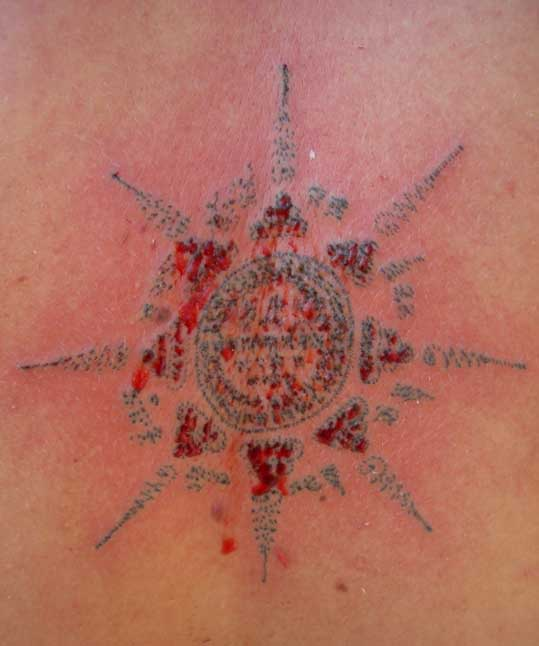
Yant Paed-thit

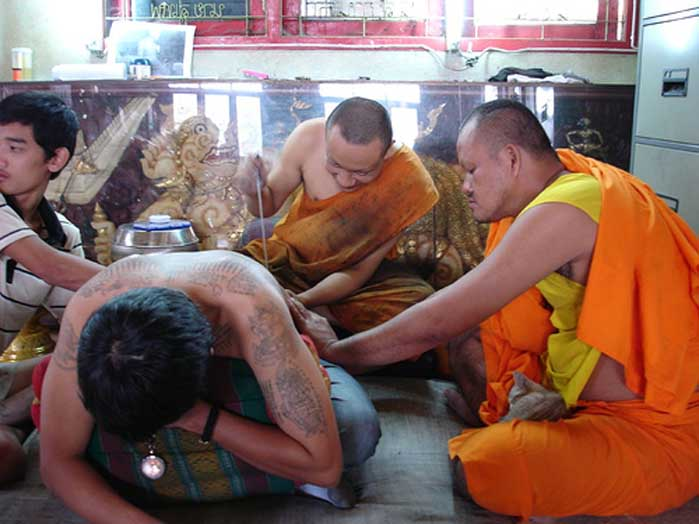
Phra Ajarn Hlwong Pi Nan tattooing at Wat Bang Phra Temple

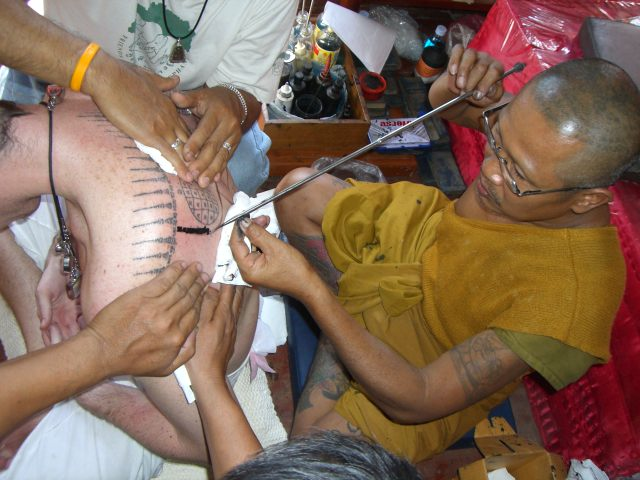
Hlwong Pi Pant tattooing a yant in Ang Thong Province.

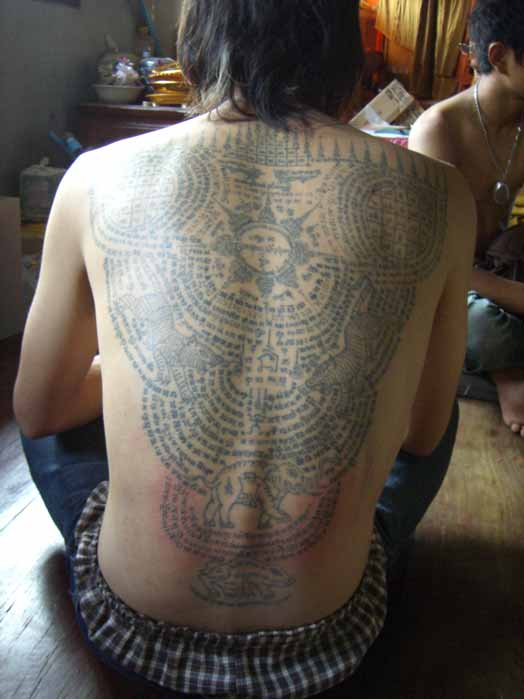
Devotee of Wat Bang Phra covered in sak yant

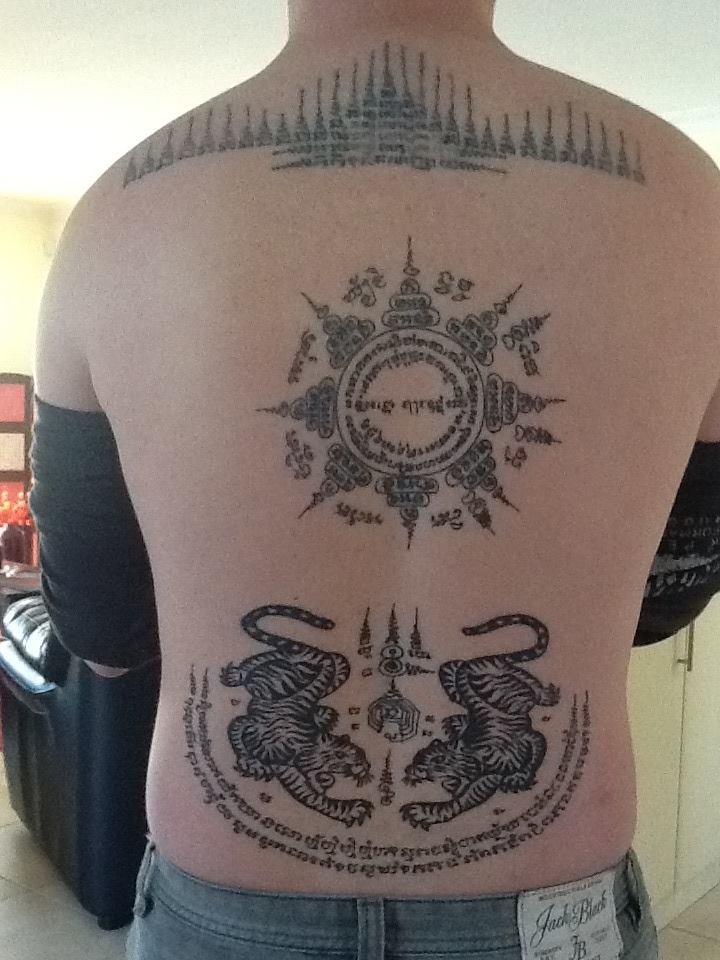
Sak yant, Nakhon Pathom

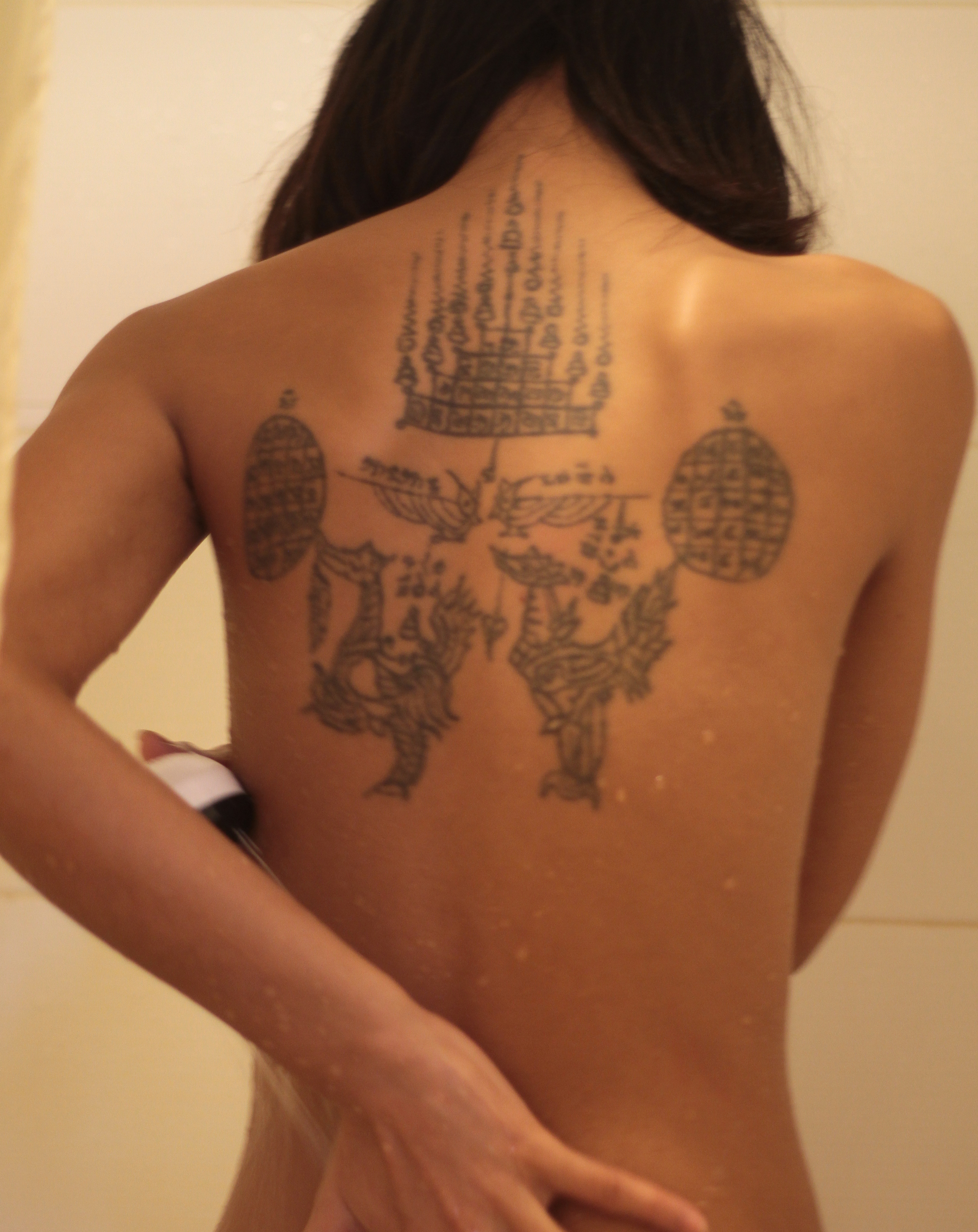
Yant Tattoo on Cambodian woman.

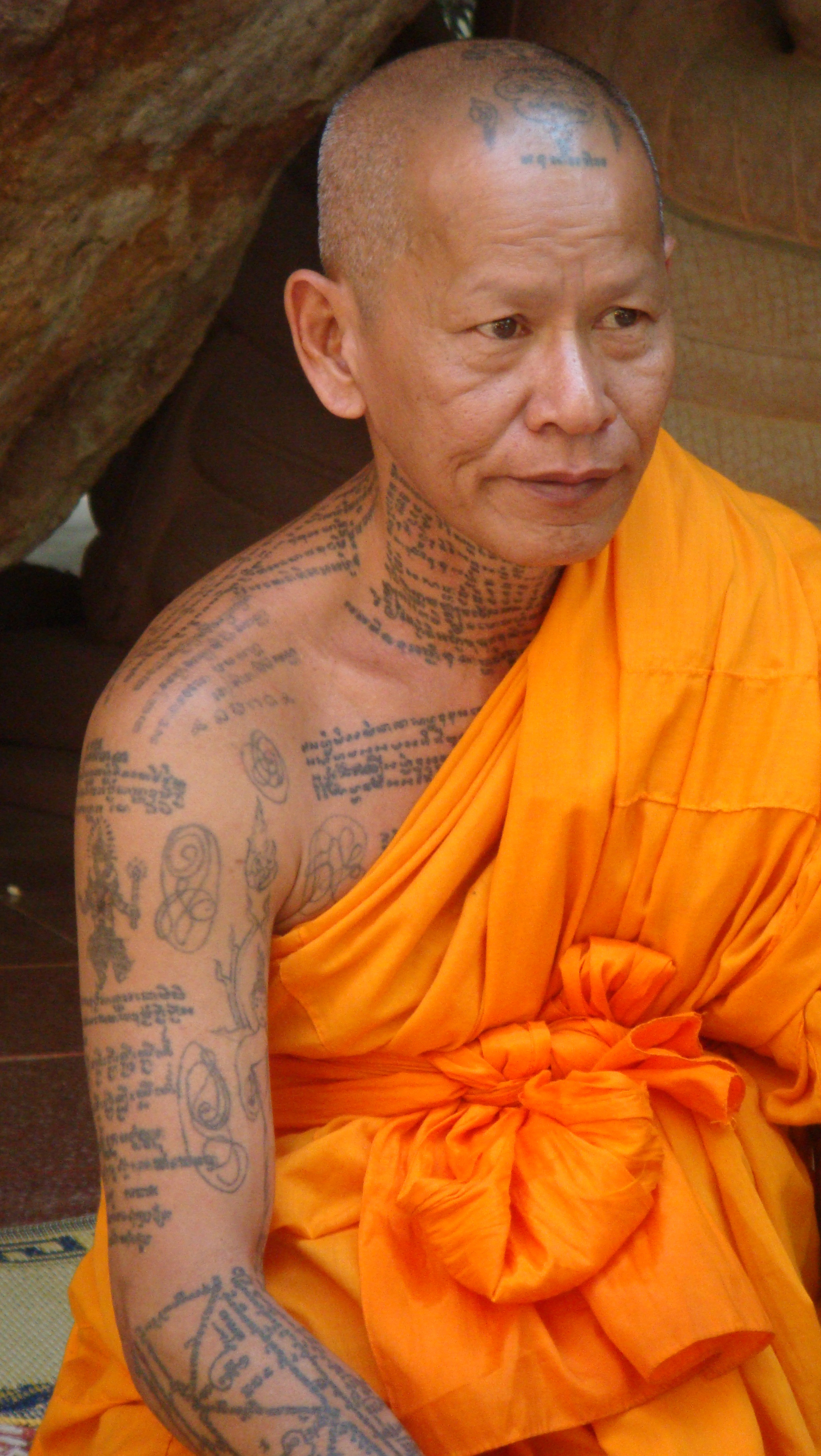
Yant tattoo on Cambodian Buddhist monk.

== See also ==
- Cetiya
- Jinapañjara
- Luang pho phet
- Rangoli
- Sacca-kiriya
- Tattooing in Myanmar
- Thai Buddha amulet
