= The Glass Palace =

Historical fiction novel by Amitav Ghosh

- Hardback 1st edition cover
- Author: Amitav Ghosh
- Language: English
- Genre: Historical Fiction
- Publisher: Ravi Dayal, Penguin India
- Publication date: 2000
- Publication place: US, India
- Media type: Print (hardback)
- ISBN: 81-7530-0310

The Glass Palace is a 2000 historical novel by Indian writer Amitav Ghosh. The novel is set in Burma, Bengal, India, and Malaya, spans a century from the Third Anglo-Burmese War and the consequent fall of the Konbaung Dynasty in Mandalay, through the Second World War to late 20th century. Through the stories of a small number of privileged families, it illuminates the struggles that have shaped Burma, India and Malaya into the places they are today. It explores the various facets of the colonial period, including the economic fall of Burma, the rise of timber and rubber plantations, the moral dilemmas faced by Indians in the British Indian Army, and the devastating effects of World War II. Focusing mainly on the early 20th Century, it explores a broad range of issues ranging from the changing economic landscape of Burma and India, to pertinent questions about what constitutes a nation and how these change as society is swept along by the tide of modernity.

The name of the novel derives from the Glass Palace Chronicle, which is an old Burmese historical work commissioned by King Bagyidaw in 1829.

== Summary ==
=== Part One - Mandalay ===
The novel starts with an 11-year-old boy called Rajkumar running through the city of Mandalay to find a woman called Ma Cho. He is the last surviving member of his family and comes to Burma from India with a bright entrepreneurial spirit and a hunger for success.

Rajkumar's work as an assistant on Ma Cho's food stall takes place in the shadow of the Glass Palace, in which King Thibaw and his wife reside with their daughters, the princesses. As the Third Anglo-Burmese War breaks out, everyday citizens of Mandalay are able to enter the enshrined building, and it is then that Rajkumar spots Dolly, one of the princesses' attendants, and instantly falls in love with her. However, the entire Royal Family and their entourage are quickly extradited by the British and sent into house arrest thousands of miles away on the West coast of India.

=== Part Two - Ratnagiri ===
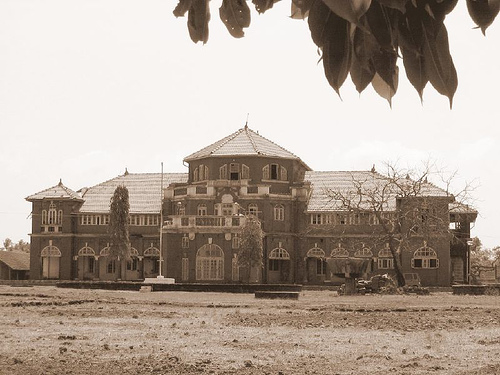
Thibaw Palace, Residence of Burmese King exiled in Ratnagiri by British. King Thibaw is one of the few real characters in the novel.

Whilst Rajkumar's career begins to take shape with the help of Saya John, a teak merchant (Ma Cho's sometime lover), we are given a glimpse into the beginnings of a new life for King Thebaw and his family as they try to settle into the port town of Ratnagiri, north of Goa. King Thebaw is appreciated by the local community, and in time the family come to feel secure and even happy in their new surroundings. In the book, Outram House (the name of the residence the British provide to house the family and what remains of their assistants) comes back into the life of Ratnagiri unexpectedly. The arrival of a new Collector stirs up resentment towards the colonial regime, but Uma, the Collector's wife, who is described as headstrong in the story, is able to help bridge the gap by befriending Dolly.

Meanwhile, Rajkumar has been enduring the hardships of the teak trade, having witnessed man and beast working together on an epic scale as elephants transport large volumes of wood down from the forests for sale into the British Empire's vastly expanding markets. Being the opportunist that he is, Rajkumar starts to make his own way in world after receiving advice from his new friend and colleague Doh Say. Borrowing cash from Saya John, he makes the journey to India to recruit poverty-stricken village-dwellers into the comparatively lucrative (yet undoubtedly perilous) world of early oil-mining in Burma. Having made enough money this way, Rajkumar does what has been his dream for some time: buy a timber-yard of his own, with Doh Say as business partner.

Having built a more than modest commercial empire, Rajkumar had one piece of unfinished business: to track down the only girl he'd ever loved, Dolly. Through an Indian connection in Rangoon (Yangon), Rajkumar makes contact with Ratnagiri via Uma, and is accordingly granted an audience with the Collector and his wife over a meal that of course stiffly conforms to colonial best practice. To his surprise, Dolly is present, and after some drama, he finally persuades her to leave the family she has been exiled with, and return with him to Burma as his wife.

Meanwhile, at Outram House, the first princess is found to be pregnant with Mohanbhai Sawant's (the coachman) child. The Collector panics at the potential scandal and tries convincing the Queen to send Sawant away and to bury the entire affair. However, the Royal Family has no qualms about the First Princess' relations with Sawant. After Dolly's departure, Uma attempts to divorce the Collector. The Collector reveals that Uma's attempt came at an apt time as his superiors had discovered the First Princess' pregnancy, costing him his job and post.

One morning, shortly before his supposed departure from Ratnagiri, the Collector takes a boat out to sea, killing himself, preferring death over shame.

=== Part Three - The Money Tree ===
Saya John prides himself on being able to spot the next big commodity, and on their return to Rangoon, he hands Rajkumar and Dolly a small clump of odd elastic material rubber, suggesting his involvement in the rubber trade.

After the Collector's suicide, Uma travels the world as a widow. Uma and Dolly continue their friendship through written letters to each other. While visiting New York, Uma meets Matthew who had been avoiding his return to Saya John. Uma discovers that Matthew is engaged to an American named Elsa. This engagement had caused Matthew to avoid returning to Saya John as Matthew feared Saya John's reaction to his son's engagement to a foreign woman and a protestant no less.

Through the help of Uma and Dolly, Saya John dispels this fear, and Matthew starts making his way home with his new bride. A happy Saya John decides to leave for Malacca to be with his son.

Meanwhile, Dolly gets pregnant with her first child but miscarries. As Saya John prepares to leave for Malacca, Dolly gives birth to another child, giving him the Burmese name "Sein Win" and the Indian name "Neelhadri" or "Neel" for short.

4 years later, Dolly has her second son "Tun Pe"/"Dinanath"("Dinu" for short) around the same time Elsa has her first child, a baby girl named "Alison". In the meantime, news breaks that Grand Duke Ferdinand is assassinated, marking the start of The Grear War (World War I).

While Dinu often fell sick, Dolly and Rajkumar rarely worried as he is a resilient child. However, one night, Dolly dreams of King Thebaw whispering something to her. She wakes up and urges Rajkumer to get Dinu to the hospital, where it is discovered that Dinu has polio. If not for Dolly's prompt actions, Dinu would have died. Dolly proceeds to find out that King Thebaw had died the night she dreamt of his warning.

King Thebaw had died from a heart attack after the Second Princess elopes with another man. His funeral was uncharacteristic for a king, with only a deputy collector attending it as the government's representative.

With King Thebaw dead, the Queen requests to be returned to Burma. The gaolers only acceded to it after the end of The Great War. The First Princess temporarily leaves Sawant to ensure the safe passage of the Queen. Back in Rangoon, family advisors attempt to convince the First Princess to leave her husband and remain with the Queen but the First Princess, exhibiting the same trait of loyalty that the Queen had for King Thebaw, defies her family and returned to Sawant in Ratnagiri, where she would live until she died 28 years later. The Second Princess and her new husband attempts to reconnect with the Queen but is vehemently refused. They both go on to start their own dairy business. The younger two princesses stay in Burma with the Queen. Six years after her return from Ratnagiri, the Queen passes away. So comes the end of the royal family's story.

Decades later, Uma visits and discovers Matthew's successful rubber plantation. However, Matthew and the British managers treat the coolies working harshly, reminding Uma of the slavery she had witnessed while in the United States. Matthew points out that it is in the nature of some of his trees to rebel against human efforts to organise them. Uma asks what would happen if the coolies were to similarly rebel.

While exploring the plantation, Uma comes across a young boy named Ilongo, who keeps following her. Ilongo's mother works on the plantation and Uma grew curious about his father. Meeting with the Ilongo's mother, Uma discovers that Rajkumar is Ilongo's biological father. After Dinu's close shave, Dolly had withdrawn into reclusion, resulting in Rajkumar having an affair, which culminated in the birth of the boy. Rajkumar now rarely visits them but he still sends money for their maintenance. Uma, angered, states her intentions to turn Rajkumar to the police. However, Ilongo's mother pleads against it, concerned that her source of money will cease.

Upon their return to Rangoon, it became apparent to Uma that tensions between the Indians and Burmese have been rising. Burmese Nationalist sought the separation between Burma and British India, causing Indians to fear for their safety as their sense of security are rooted in the British imperial rule. Further, resentment grew towards the Indian businesses that exploited poor locals - including businesses owned by Rajkumar and Matthew. The rise in tension ultimately culminated in a racial riot where Uma and Dolly watched an Indian man decapitated in broad daylight. The Burmese declare their own king, marking the start of an uprising and rebellion. The colonial authorities respond in kind, sending Indian troops to hunt down insurgents and rebels as a means of suppression. Uma contemplates how the Indians are used by the colonisers against the Burmese when they should be friends. Rajkumar, having benefitted from imperial rule, rebuked Dolly as being ridiculous, claiming that the colonial authorities and Indian troops protect them. Angered, especially with the knowledge of Rajkumar's illegitimate child, Dolly berates Rajkumar for being a greedy person complicit in the mistreatment and exploitation of the Burmese local, calling him a rapist and slaver.

=== Part Four - The Wedding ===
Uma's brother has three children: a younger daughter, Bela, and a pair of twins: Manju and Arjun. Arjun enrols in the Indian Military Academy, becoming one of the first few Indian commissioned officers. Meanwhile, Neel and Manju get engaged.

On the day of the wedding, Dinu notes a change in Arjun's behaviour since his enlistment in the army. Arjun relishes the fact that he is one of the first few "modern Indians" to have lived like a Westerner and to live in proximity with them as a commissioned officer. Tangentially, he shares about the resentment that other Indian soldiers feel against the Indian commissioned officers - namely that their pride came from serving the English and it was unfathomable to them to differ to a fellow Indian.

=== Part Five - Morningside ===
World War II erupts, and the British begin deploying Indian troops around the world. Some Indian troops decide to mutiny against the British, with a soldier in Singapore going as far as killing his officer before committing suicide. As Arjun and his fellow officer, Hardy, continue hearing of the unrest among local soldiers against the British, Hardy starts showing signs of defiance himself, being cognizant of the incongruence between his officer creed and the reality of how the British empire treats the Indian soldiers. Soon, Arjun and Hardy are mobilised for war and on board their vessel, they find out they have been deployed to Singapore. In Singapore, Arjun himself starts to question his own soldiering values and whether he is a mercenary.

Meanwhile, Matthew and Elsa die in a car accident, orphaning Alison and leaving Saya John with severe dementia. Dinu visits Alison, partially to console her but also to inform her of Rajkumar's wishes for her to sell Morningside. However, Dinu is unable to raise the topic, especially with Alison grieving. Dinu spends his days taking photos of Morningside's nature. One day, he comes across Alison in the water and the two have sex.

Dinu meets Ilongo and discovers that he is his half-brother. He decides he never wants to return to Rangoon. Ignoring Rajkumar's letters, he tells Alison he intends to stay in Morningside with her. Dinu proposes marrying Alison but she rejects the idea, suggesting what they currently have is good enough.

Soon Arjun visits Dinu and Alison, after receiving concerned messages from Manju about Dinu's disappearance. Arjun and Alison seem to share an intense chemistry almost immediately, raising some jealousy in Dinu. As Arjun's visits to Alison becomes more frequent, Dinu could feel Alison's interest in him gradually fade until it was as though she scarcely remembered that he existed. Upset, Dinu decides to leave Morningside. Meanwhile, Alison and Arjun have sex. However, Alison regrets it. Realising her betrayal, she cries. Arjun is dismissive of her concerns and the two part on acrimonious terms as Arjun is recalled to the army base and Alison calls him a weapon in someone else's hand.

=== Part Six - The Front ===
As the Japanese start their bombing raids, Dinu delays his departure to find Alison. Alison admits to what she has done and confesses to Dinu that she loves him. Dinu and Alison decide to flee to Singapore.

Meanwhile, more Indian soldiers start deserting their post or killing their officers to flee as the bombings continue to incite fear among them. When Arjun's battalion is attacked by a tank, Hardy pontificates how even if they had successfully fended off the attacks, the Indian soldiers would never be given credit for their heroism. The CO of Arjun's battalion, aware of the increasing sentiment among the Indian soldiers, warns Arjun about the consequences of a traitor soldier. Shortly after, Arjun is wounded and separated from his battalion. As his mind wandered from the pain of his wounds, he begins reflecting on his lack of real autonomy. When he is reunited with his battalion, he discovers that Hardy has led a mutiny, joining the Japanese. Arjun argues with Hardy that this is merely a change of masters. Eventually, Arjun decides to defect on the condition that their CO be released. The CO realises that Arjun had turn coat and tells Arjun that when the war ends, he will be there to watch Arjun get hanged as a traitor.

Meanwhile, Dinu, Alison, and Saya John attempt to board an evacuation train but are prohibited from doing so as the trains were reserved exclusively for white people only. Dinu is punched when he tries to protest this. Dinu tells Alison she has to escape with Saya John using the car. Since the car would only carry 2 persons, Dinu and Alison reluctantly agree to part ways. They spent their last night together in Morningside before Dinu passed Alison a revolver for her safety. He tells Alison about Dolly's childhood story of how she had given sweets to the British soldiers escorting her and the royal family out of Mandalay for her survival, hinting to her that she should prioritise her survival at all cost. The two part ways, refusing to say goodbye, asserting that they will meet again.

Later, the car breaks down. Saya John, in his senile state, insists on going to church. Alison thinks he had gone to the trees to relief himself but discovers that he must have wandered off in an attempt to get to a church. As she chased Saya John down, she finds him surrounded by Japanese soldiers. However, due to his lack of mental capacity, Saya John was unable to comprehend the situation and tried pushing pass them. Alison draws her revolver but is too late as a soldier stabs Saya John with a bayonet. She opens fire, taking out a few soldiers before she is hit by a bullet herself. As she hears the Japanese soldiers running her way, she thinks of Dolly's story of survival and giving sweets to the British soldiers for her survival. She relishes in the fact that she is not the kind of person who would appeal to an oppressor for survival; that she struck back and made them pay. She puts the gun to her temple and pulls the trigger.

Due to the air raids, elephants at the timberyard panicking, killing Neel. Rajkumar, Dolly and the now widowed Manju have to flee Rangoon. Manju gradually loses her will to live but those around her insist on her perseverance for the sake of her child. While leaving Rangoon on a boat, Manju throws herself into the water, killing herself.

=== Part Seven - The Glass Palace ===
Dolly and Rajkumar, carrying Manju's infant, Jaya, seek out Uma at her place of residence. Uma takes the trio in. Rajkumar starts losing his mental capacity and Dolly decides to return to Burma alone to find Dinu. She leaves a letter behind for Rajkumar before making her departure. Rajkumar and Dolly will never meet again.

In a time skip, Jaya grows up, marries young, is widowed and gets her PhD. In 1996, she decided to visit Ratnagiri and to visit the Collector's compound where Uma had lived.

Jaya then tracked down Dinu in Burma, where the Junta has taken over. We are given insight to what transpired after Dinu and Alison separated. Dinu had returned to Huay Zedi only to find that Dolly, Rajkumar and Manju had fled. The Japanese forces were being repelled in the area but a group of Indian soldiers who were allied with the Japanese were spotted nearby. Dinu was put forward to negotiate with the soldiers by virtue of his ethnicity. He comes across Kishan Singh, Arjun's batman, and eventually meets Arjun. Dinu tells Arjun about Alison's death, prompting Arjun to break down crying.

Later, Arjun is forced to execute Kishan when Kishan deserts his post. The allied forces eventually find and surround a depressed Arjun, requesting his surrender but Arjun, wanting to be shot dead, shoots at the allied forces until he is killed.

In 1948, as Communist-led insurgencies broke put in Burma, Dolly finally finds Dinu. He accompanies her to Sagaing where she shaves her head to be a nun. When he visits her a year later, he is told that Dolly has passed away. Dinu opens his own studio called "The Glass Palace", inspired by stories from his mother. Dinu meets a writer, Thin Thin Aye and the two marry.

In the 1950s, General Ne Win comes into power through a coup and university students at Thin Thin Aye's school are shot. Thin Thin Aye has to quit her job as the publication board starts imposing strict censorship. As Aung San Suu Kyi joins the political fray in Burma, Dinu finds in himself a reinvigoration to attend political meetings again.

In 1988, Thin Thin Aye goes out for a march without Dinu. Gunshots are heard a few hours later and the police appear at Dinu's door, taking him away to question him about the insurgencies an suggesting that his wife has been arrested too.

In the present (1996), Aung San Suu Kyi is in her 6th year of house arrest. Dinu decides to bring Jaya to her house where she continues holding meetings. Dinu asks about Rajkumar and it is revealed that the in their final days, Uma and Rajkumar had been lovers.

== Characters ==
=== Burmese Royal Family ===
- Thibaw Min (the last king of the Konbaung kingdom of Burma who was exiled to Ratnagiri, India)
- Supayalat (the last queen of Burma)
- Hteiksu Myat Phaya Gyi
- Hteiksu Myat Phaya Lat
- Hteiksu Myat Phaya
- Hteiksu Myat Phaya Galay

=== Rajkumar's Family ===
- Rajkumar Raha (the central character, a Bengali orphan who finds himself in Burma)
- Dolly Sein (lady-in-waiting to Queen Supayalat, whom Rajkumar encounters as a child)
- Neel Raha (Rajkumar and Dolly's elder son, who aspires to take over his father's business)
- Dinu Raha (Rajkumar and Dolly's younger son, an aspiring photographer)
- Jaya Raha (Neel and Manju's daughter)

=== Saya John's Family ===
- Saya John Martins (Rajkumar's mentor, an entrepreneur in Burma and Malaya)
- Matthew Martins (Saya John's son)
- Elsa Hoffman (Matthew's American wife)
- Alison Martins (Matthew and Elsa's daughter)
- Timmy Martins (Matthew and Elsa's son)

=== Uma Dey's Family ===
- Beni Prasad Dey (District Collector at Ratnagiri)
- Uma Dey (Collector Dey's wife)
- Manju Roy (Uma's niece)
- Arjun Roy (Uma's nephew, Manju's twin)
- Bela Roy (Uma's younger niece)

== Reception ==
Globally, Complete Review saying on the consensus "No consensus. Some very enthusiastic (especially critics in India), some quite disappointed."

== Awards and translations ==
The Glass Palace was the Eurasian regional winner in the "Best Book" category of the 2001 Commonwealth Writers' Prize, but Amitav Ghosh was not aware that his publishers had submitted his book, and he withdrew it upon learning that he had won the regional round. It is also winner of Grand Prize for Fiction, Frankfurt eBook Award, 2001 and New York Times Notable Books of 2001.

The Glass Palace was translated and published into over 25 languages. It was also translated into Burmese by writer Nay Win Myint and published serialized at one of Burma's leading literary magazines Shwe Amyutay. Since the last part of novel is an extended elegy to Aung San Suu Kyi, Burmese Press Scrutiny Board asked for many cuts in the translation. The Burmese translation won the Myanmar National Literature Award in 2012.
