= Myat Phaya Gyi =

Princess of Burma

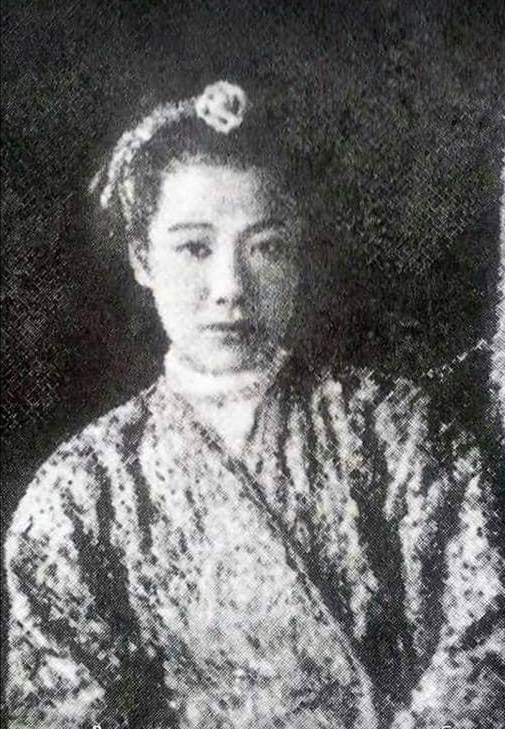
- Myat Phaya Gyi, c. 1914
- Born: 5 September 1880; Royal Palace, Burma
- Died: 3 June 1947 (aged 66); Ratnagiri, India
- Spouse: Gopalrao Sawant
- Issue: Tu Tu Sawant
- Father: Thibaw Min
- Mother: Supayalat
- Religion: Theravada Buddhism

Princess Myat Phaya Gyi (Burmese: မြတ်ဖုရားကြီး; 5 September 1880 – 3 June 1947) was a Burmese royal princess and most senior member of the Royal House of Konbaung. She was the eldest daughter of the last ruling king of Burma, King Thibaw, and his queen Supayalat.

After falling in love with an Indian servant, the princess embarrassed the royal family, gave up her royal princess insignia, and lived a life of dire poverty and isolation until her death. Her story still intrigues many in Myanmar, where she is seen as a romantic and yet tragic figure who fell from the grace of the golden palace to a pauper because of her unshakable love.

== Life ==
=== In the royal palace ===
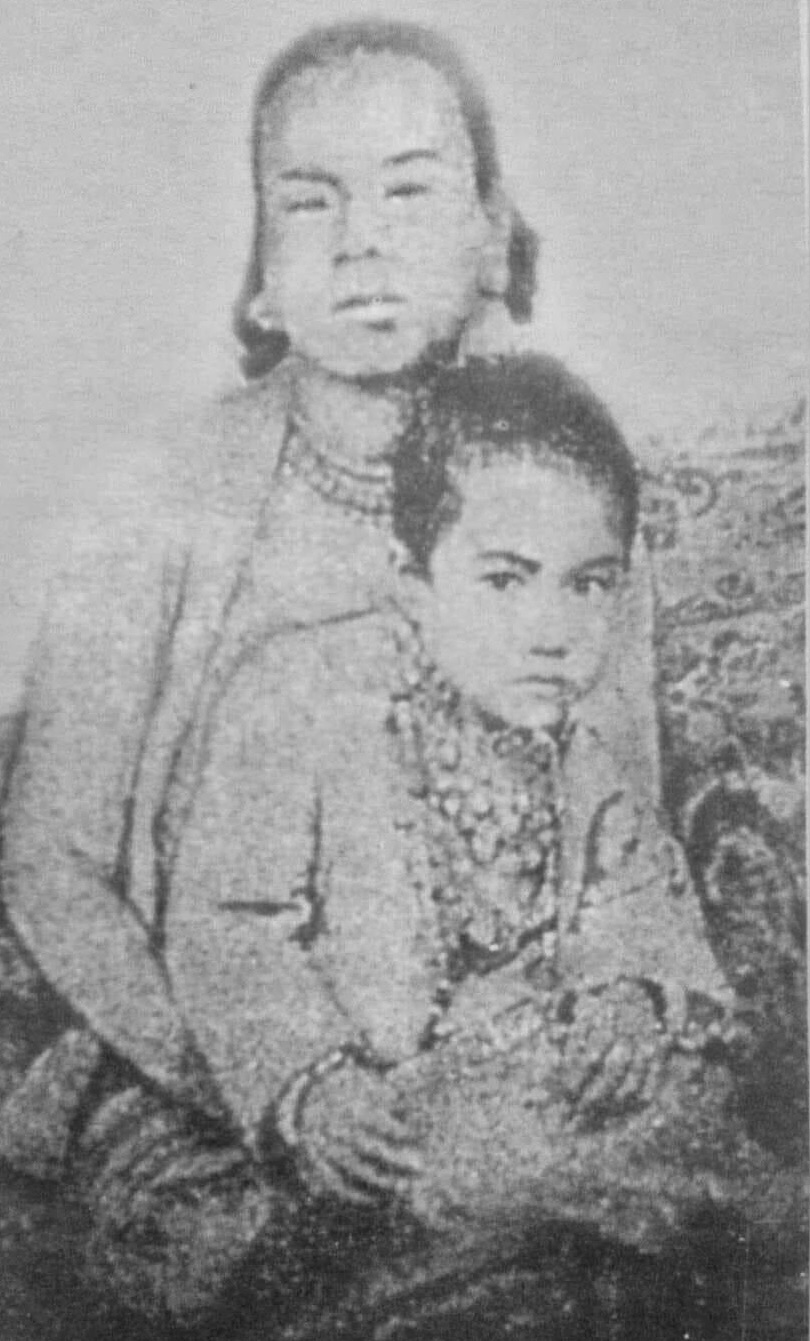
Myat Phaya Gyi and her nurse Taungzin Princess, c. 1884

Princess Myat Phaya Gyi was born on 5 September 1880, at the Royal Palace, Mandalay. She was King Thibaw's firstborn daughter by his chief queen, Supayalat. Several ceremonies were held after her birth to honor her royal rank, but the largest of all was the Dawthakarana (cradling) ceremony, in which she was placed in an emerald-studded cradle in front of the Bee Throne in the Glass Palace. Hundreds of magnificent gifts were brought to her, including valuable stones, pearls, jewelry, solid gold bowls, bolts of fine cloth, and so on. The Thonze Princess and the Taungzin Princess were chosen as her head nurse and second nurse, respectively, and numerous palace maids were appointed to assist them.

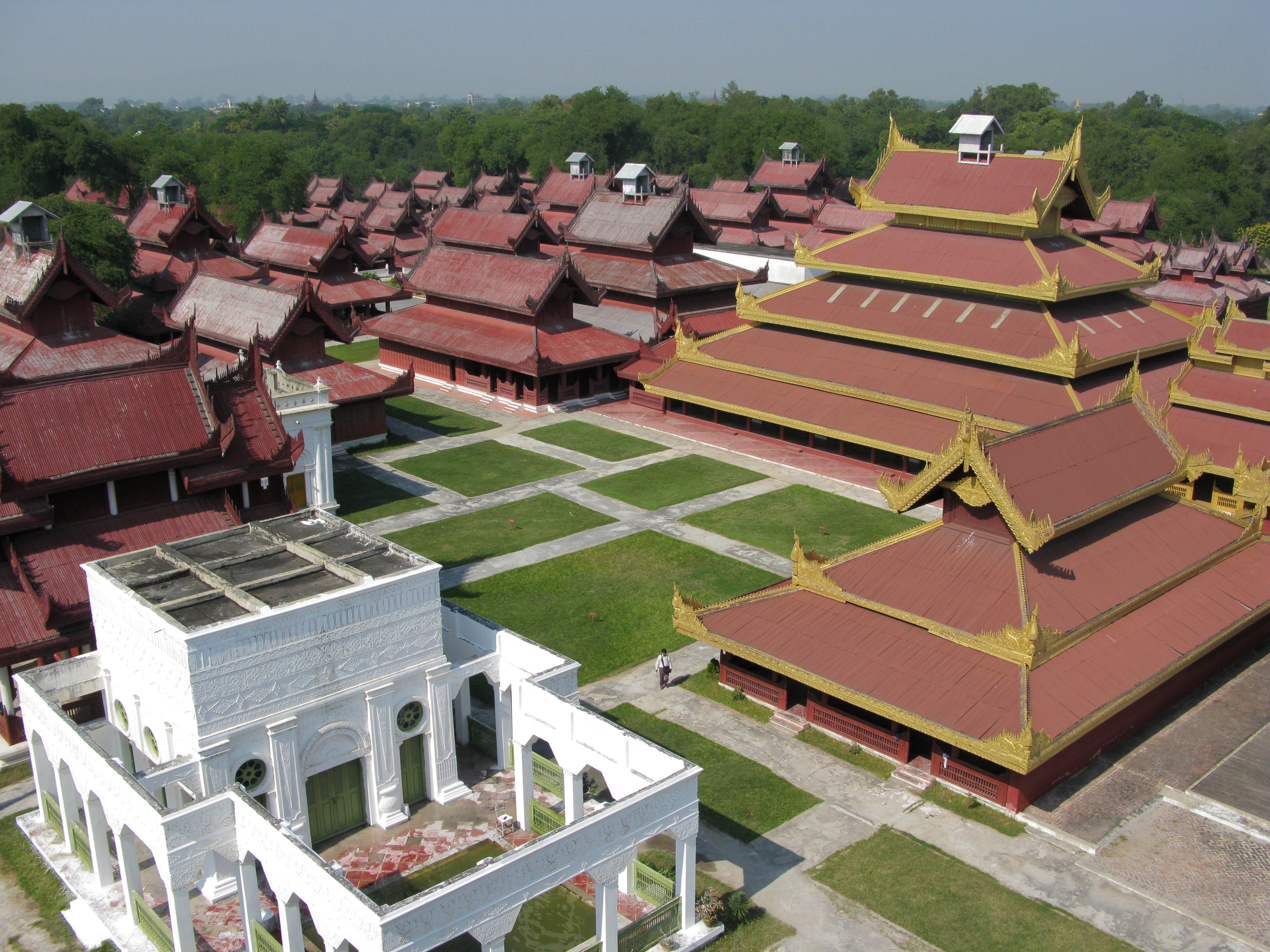
Mandalay Palace grounds

When she was five years old, King Thibaw was defeated in the Third Anglo-Burmese War and forced to abdicate by the British in 1885. On 25 November 1885, they were taken away in a covered carriage, leaving Mandalay Palace by the southern gate of the walled city, along the streets lined by British soldiers and the king's wailing subjects, to the river Irrawaddy where a steamboat called Thuriya (Sun) awaited. They were exiled to the remote coastal town of Ratnagiri in India, where they lived for over 30 years. She did not receive any formal education.

=== In Ratnagiri ===
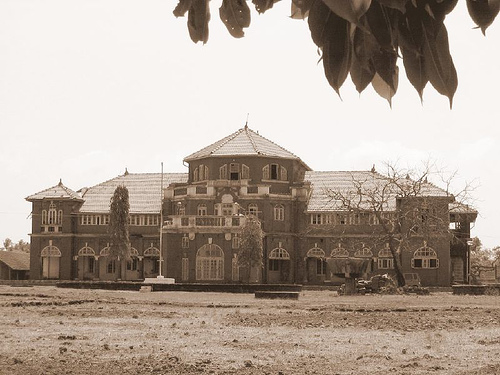
The brick palace in Ratnagiri that Myat Phaya Gyi and the royal family was exiled to

Myat Phaya Gyi fell in love with Gopal Bhaurao Sawant, an Indian palace gatekeeper, in 1906, when she was 26 years old, and had a child with him. At the time, he was already married. According to Hindu tradition, Gopal could not marry the princess since he already had a wife. For the embarrassed royal family, she was the black sheep. Her father was infuriated by the affair as it was an unforgivable offense for a lowly palace servant to have impregnated a princess. She was judged harshly by the conservative and rigid society of those days. A few years after the death of King Thibaw in 1916, the royal family was allowed to return to Burma. However, she was unwelcome because of her relationship with an Indian servant. Soon after returning to Burma, she gave birth to a stillborn son. The stillbirth made the other royal family members happy.

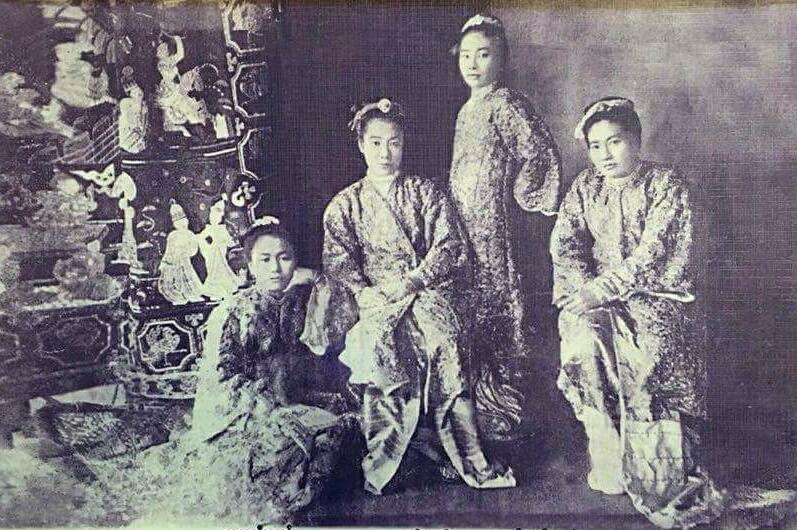
The four daughters of King Thibaw and Queen Supayalat, princesses Myat Phaya Galay, Myat Phaya Gyi, Myat Phaya Lat, Myat Phaya

A number of letters were written by Gopal begging the princess to return to him. Despite the royal family's opposition, she signed a royal edict stripping herself of all her titles, as well as royal decorations, and eventually returned to Ratnagiri with her daughter Tu Tu Sawant, but Gopal failed to keep his promise. He also wasted her royal pension, which she had received from the British government. Gopal used her money to buy a house for his wife and more than 200 acres of land in Ratnagiri. He abandoned the princess and his daughter in a small hut. The princess was too shy to go out and stayed in her room, waiting for Gopal to visit her (which he did for a few hours). She had no interaction with her royal relatives. A year before her death, when the Indian police force came to demolish the hut she lived in as part of a government plan to demolish it, she asked to remain, but in the end she stayed for three days next to the demolished hut. She had to sleep on the ground and only had two chairs for furniture in her hut during her time in Ratnagiri.

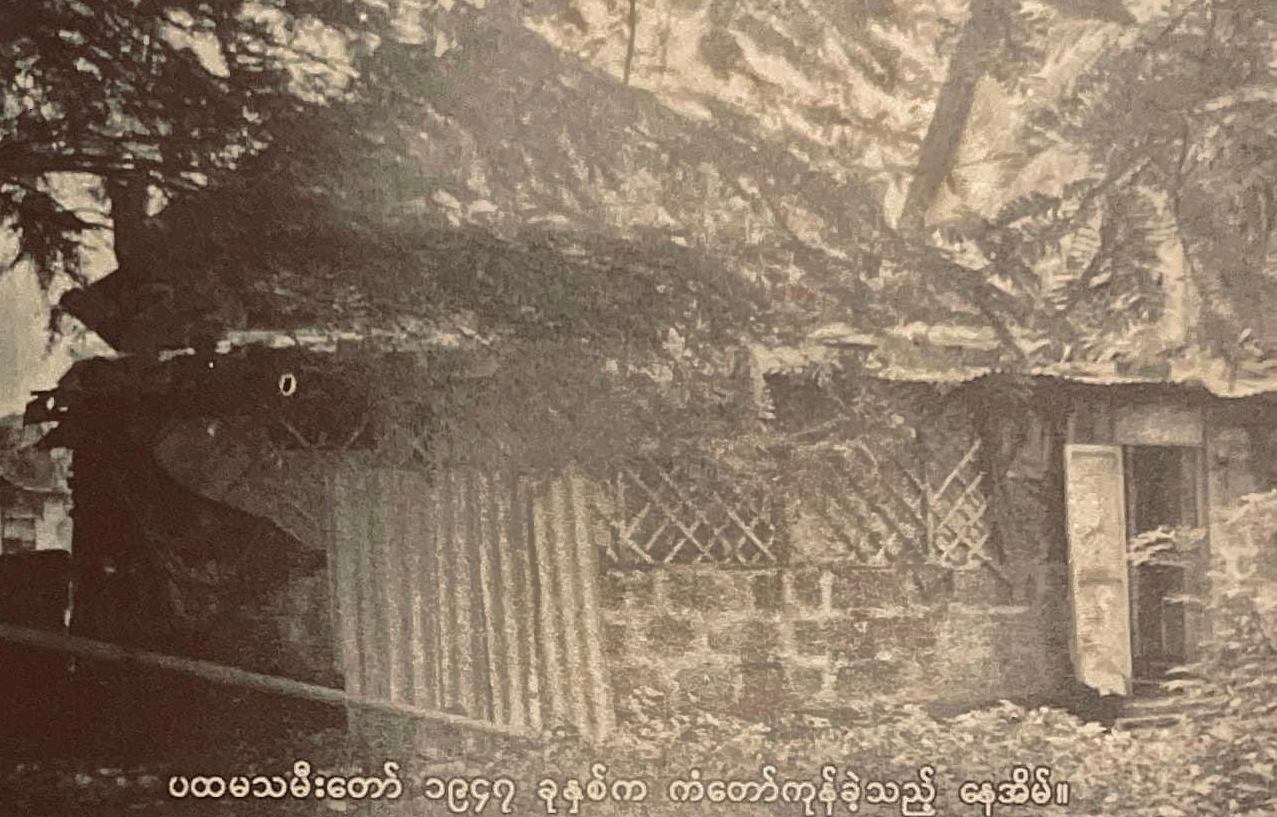
The princess's hut in Ratnagiri

Prior to her death on the night of 3 June 1947, at the age of 66, the princess lived a life of terrible poverty and isolation. Her body was carried from Ratnagiri's main road to the cemetery, attended by merchants and representatives of various organizations. The Ratnagiri police force presented a guard of honor, complete with a gun salute. The Indian government built a brick mausoleum for her at a cost of Rs 5,000 next to her father King Thibaw's mausoleum. Her urn was kept at the Ratnagiri Treasury until it was decided whether to send it back to Burma or bury it inside the tomb. However, the princess's urn was then misplaced.

Her daughter Tu Tu married an Indian driver, Shankar Powar, and lived in poverty. Her entire family became Indian citizens.
