= Plerng Phra Nang =

- Also known as: The Royal Fire
- Genre: Drama; Revenge; Costume period
- Based on: Plerng Phra Nang by Kom-Rae Ngao
- Written by: Paak Rapee
- Directed by: Teerasak Promngoen
- Starring: Pachrapa Chaichua; Chiranan Manochaem; Kelly Tanapat; Chawallakorn Wanthanapisitkul; Tussaneeya Karnsomnuch
- Opening theme: "The Royal Fire" (เพลิงพระนาง) by Jennifer Kim
- Ending theme: "Everything For You" (ทุกอย่างเพื่อเธอ) by Ditkorn Disayanon
- Country of origin: Thailand
- Original language: Thai
- No. of episodes: 26

Production
- Executive producer: Somsook Kaljaruek
- Producer: Chitralada Disayanon
- Production locations: Chiang Mai, Thailand
- Running time: 130 minutes (per episode); Fridays, Saturdays and Sundays at 20:30 (ICT)
- Production companies: Bangkok Broadcasting & T.V. Co., Ltd; Kantana Movie Town (2002) Co., Ltd

Original release
- Network: Channel 7
- Release: February 17 – April 15, 2017

Related
- Evening News: Second Edition; Chid Jor Ror Doo

Plerng Phra Nang (Thai: เพลิงพระนาง; RTGS: Phloeng Phra Nang; lit: Her Majesty's Flame; International title: The Royal Fire) was a Thai TV drama or lakorn. It aired on Thailand's Channel 7 from February 17 to April 15, 2017 on Fridays, Saturdays and Sundays at 20:30 for a total of 26 episodes.

== Plot summary ==
The story is a thinly veiled depiction of the life story of Hsinbyumashin, queen of Burma (now Myanmar). It is set in the fictional country of Mueang Thip. Lady Ananthip has been stripped of her royal title. Her father, the late King Pitula, was deposed in a coup led by King Burapha Kham, who is the elder brother of Crown Princess Sekkaradewi. Out of resentment, she seeks revenge and precipitates the loss of Mueang Thip's independence.

== Cast ==
Main characters

Role	Actor
Ananthip	Pachrapa Chaichua
Sekkhara Thewi	Chiranan Manochaem
Mueang Khum	Kelly Tanapat
Tong Nuan	Chawallakorn Wanthanapisitkul
Samphao Ngam	Chamaiporn Jaturaput
Man Fa	Tonont Wongboon
Tong Paeng	Chanon Akkarachata
Rim Bueng	Chatchadaporn Thanantha
Khrong Phop	Anuwat Choocherdrattana
Pin Mani	Tussaneeya Karnsomnuch
Renumat	Waritthisa Limthammahisorn
Thong Phaya	Panichada Sangsuwan

Supporting characters

Role	Actor
Bua Lai	Jarusiri Phuwanai
Fuang	Khansiri Sirimart
Peng	Pimdao Raveemongkolsathian
Khanong	Arucha Tosawat
Padaeng	Thapanat Sattayanurak
Kruea On	Thamonpan Panuchitphutthiwong
Yot Phum	Sornsin Maneewan
Noi Intha	Noppol Pitaklopanich
Mani Yat	Kanyakorn Pinij
Ketthawa	Rungrawee Barijindakul
Kaeo Akat	Apasra Intalaadchoom
Thao Wongsa	Thapakorn Disayanon
Khun Wiang	Phutharit Prombandal
Thao Fuea Faeng	Chomvichai Meksuwan
Khun Saeng Mueang	Thitinant Suwannasak
Khun Hom Fa	Wuthinant Maikan
Burapha Kham	Winai Kraibutr
Pitula	Thongkhaw Khunsriraksa
Khun Saeng Ta	Thanakorn Prathumsiri
Mr. Hass	Peter Tuinstra
Ruen Kaeo	Jittima Wisutthipranee
King of Mueang Meed	Pongsanart Vinsiri
King of Tha Khoi	Nukkid Boonthong

== Criticism, impact and ratings ==
Plerng Phra Nang is a remake of a 1996 drama of the same name, also produced by Kantana Group. The script was based on M.R.Kukrit Pramoj’s 1969 nonfiction book The Fall of the Burmese (พม่าเสียกรุง) and Prince Damrong Rajanubhab’s Journey Through Burma in 1936: A View of the Culture, History and Institutions (เที่ยวเมืองพม่า).

Comparisons were made between the costumes of the characters in the 2017 version and those worn by Fan Bingbing in The Empress of China. There were also complaints that some scenes were unrealistic.

Soe Win, the great-grandson of Thibaw Min, the last King of Burma, called the drama "unwatchable" and "distasteful" and asked for the series to be taken off the air. The producer, Chitralada Disayanon, argued that the plot was "“unrelated to Burma and is completely fictional, with the costumes and setting not meant to evoke any country or time period in particular”. However, the massacre of 100 royal family members is a clear reference to events in Burma in 1879. There is also a direct mapping between the members of the Burmese royal family of the time and the characters in the drama: Lady Ananthip is Hsinbyumashin, King Muangkoom is Mindon Min, Queen Pinmanee is Queen Supayalat, King Maanfah is Thibaw Min, Upparat Kanaung is Kanaung Mintha and King Burapha Kham is Tharrawaddy Min.

The rating for the finale was 9.037 and the average nationwide rating for all episodes was 6.626. Google ranked the phrase "Plerng Phra Nang" as the fourth most searched term by Thais in 2017, ranked second place in the category of television programs.

== Awards and nominations ==
Year	Award	Category	Recipient	Result
2017	3rd Maya Awards	Popular TV Drama	Plerng Phra Nang	Won
2017	3rd Maya Awards	Popular Actress	Pachrapa Chaichua	Won
2017	3rd Maya Awards	Popular Supporting Actress	Chiranan Manochaem	Won
2017	3rd Maya Awards	Popular Supporting Actress	Chawallakorn Wanthanapisitkul	Nominated
2017	3rd Maya Awards	Popular Actor	Kelly Tanapat	Nominated
2017	3rd Maya Awards	Popular Director in a TV Drama	Teerasak Promngoen	Nominated
2017	3rd Maya Awards	Best OST in a TV Drama	Plerng Phra Nang – Jennifer Kim	Nominated
2017	2nd Darainside Awards	Best Actress	Chiranan Manochaem	Won
2017	2nd Darainside Awards	Best Actor	Kelly Tanapat	Won
2017	2nd Darainside Awards	Best Supporting Actress	Chawallakorn Wanthanapisitkul	Won
2017	2nd Darainside Awards	Best Director in a TV Drama	Teerasak Promngoen	Won
2017	5th Phra Phikanet Awards	Excellent Actress	Chiranan Manochaem	Won
