= Maung Pe Nge =

Taungthaman Le-sar Maung Pe Nge

Lord of Taungthaman
- Tenure: 1878 – 1882
- King: Thibaw Min
- Born: Maung Pe Nge c. 1838; Mandalay
- Died: March 1882; Bhamo
- Spouse: Thingamaw Princess
- Issue: Maung Yaw; Maung Maung Phyo; Tin Tin Oo
- House: Konbaung
- Religion: Theravada Buddhism

Taungthaman Le-sar Maung Pe Nge (Burmese: တောင်သမန်လယ်စား မောင်ဖေငယ်), was a Burmese court official, noted poet, and a companion of King Thibaw. He was the Lord of Taungthaman with the title of Taungthaman Le-sar (တောင်သမန်လယ်စား).

== Biography ==
According to the royal chronicles, Maung Pe Nge's lineage traced back to the Princess of Magyitone, who was the daughter of Ananda Thiri, a royal concubine of King Bodawpaya. Maung Pe Nge was the grandson of this princess and Prince Min Ye Kyawswa of Shweku, the son of Bodawpaya and his consort, Madaya Myosa Mibaya. However, the names of his parents were unknown. Maung Pe Nge served as an advisor and close confidant to Prince Thibaw. Additionally, he held the position of Letthonedawgyi (လက်သုံးတော်ကြီး, lit. royal guard commander), a trusted official responsible for guarding the king and queen closely, overseeing the weaponry carried, and held the title of Duke of Yenantha. According to Taingda Mingyi's The Golden Palace Royal Chronicle, he also granted the title of "Maha Minhla Minhtin Sithu".

After Thibaw's accession to the throne, Maung Pe Nge was appointed as the minister of HM Horses and also assumed the role of head of the HM Treasury. Notably, Maung Pe Nge was also renowned for composing a collection of romantic poems, both for his personal expression and on behalf of various members of the royal family. His contemporary poets were U Ponnya and Achoketan Saya Pe.

It is said that Maung Pe Nge held a deep affection for Daing Khin Khin, his childhood friend and the daughter of the Duke of Kenni. However, despite her parents initially consenting to their marriage, King Thibaw also loved her and asked Maung Pe Nge to assist in facilitating a relationship with Daing Khin Khin. Supayalat eventually became aware of the unfolding situation. Shortly thereafter, Maung Maung Toke, Maung Pe Nge, Daing Khin Khin, and her family faced arrest on orders from the Hluttaw Council, with charges related to an alleged plot to seize the throne. Maung Maung Toke committed suicide, and Maung Pe Nge was sent to Bhamo and subsequently executed. However, before his execution in April 1882, he managed to convey his affection to Daing Khin Khin through a heartfelt poem, beseeching her to observe the obsequies for him. Regrettably, by that time, Daing Khin Khin had already met her demise at the hands of the executioner, despite being pregnant with the child of King Thibaw. His story remains a significant part of popular Burmese theater, where he is portrayed as a poignant and romantic figure.

In an alternate account, Maung Pe Nge's relationship with Daing Khin Khin and her family is described as nothing more than friendly visits, devoid of any romantic involvement. Maung Pe Nge had married to Thingamaw Princess, a former minor queen of King Tharrawaddy, as well as two other lesser wives. The poem mentioned was originally intended for his chief wife, but for dramatic effect, the author took the liberty of making minor alterations to the poem so that it appeared to be addressed to Daing Khin Khin.

== Family ==
According to Maung Than Swe's Taungthaman Shindan, Maung Pe Nge had a son named Maung Yaw with Thingamaw Princess, a daughter named Tin Tin Oo by an unnamed Burmese wife, and another son named Maung Maung Phyo by an unnamed ethnic Chin wife.

== In popular culture ==
- Maung Pe Nge is the subject of Seint's novel Daing Khin Khin, published in 1976.
