= Achoketan Saya Pe =

Burmese poet

- အချုပ်တန်း ဆရာဖေ
- Born: Pe; 23 June 1838; Inwa
- Died: 1894 (aged 55–56); Shan States
- Occupation: Poet
- Writing career
- Language: Burmese
- Genres: Taydat, laygyo

Achoke Tan Saya Pe (Burmese: အချုပ်တန်း ဆရာဖေ, lit. 'Saya Pe of Tailors' Row') was a Burmese poet during the late Konbaung era, famous for his anti-colonial Burmese lyric poems called taydats. His contemporary poet is U Ponnya, and same-name poet is Taungthaman Le-sar Maung Pe Nge.

== Life ==
Saya Pe was born on 23 June 1838 in Inwa. His father was part of the royal household staff during the reign of King Pagan, and later became a tailor sewing saddles for the royal cavalry during the reign of King Mindon. His mother was descended from a line of artisans.

Living in Tailors' Row (Achoke Tan), west of the southern gate (Mingala Gate), present-day Cittaramahi quarters, Saya Pe became known as Achoke Tan Saya Pe.

Pe served as a bearer of Prince of Mekkhaya's insignia (အဆောင်ကိုင်) during the reign of King Mindon.

After the abdication of King Thibaw, Saya Pe went to the Shan States, and served under the Saopha of Thonze. Pe died on circa 1894 at where he sheltered.

== Career ==
Saya Pe composed many poems, especially taydats (တေးထပ်) and laygyos (လေးချိုး). The renowned ones are:

- Tway Mi Daing (တွေးမိတိုင်း) (lit. 'Whenever I consider')
- Shwe Zi-byu Thabaw Thoh (ရွှေဆီးဖြူ သဘောသို့) (lit. 'Like a gooseberry')
- Min Tutu Khway Thethe (မင်းတုတု ခွေးသေသေ) (lit. 'The dog vying for the King had died')
- Hsaung Yadu Pwe (ဆောင်းရတုပွဲ) (lit. 'The Winter Festival')

== See also ==
Burmese literature
