= Daing Khin Khin =

Burmese noblewoman

- ဒိုင်းခင်ခင်
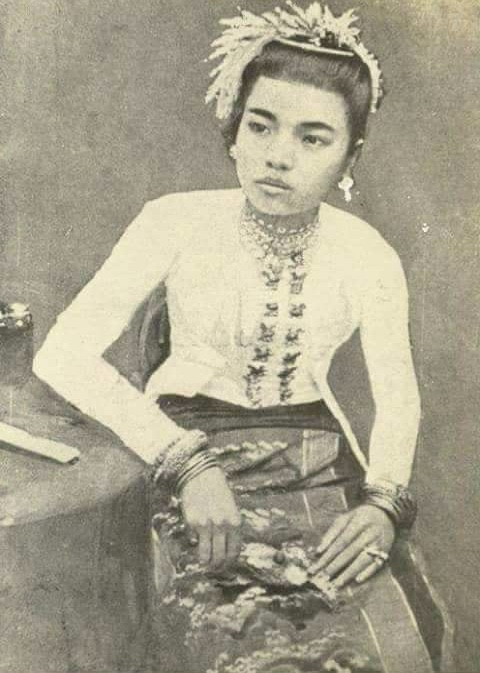
- Born: Khin Khin Gyi c. 1863; Konbaung dynasty
- Died: April 1882
- Other names: Mi Khingyi
- Known for: Royal concubine of Thibaw Min
- Parent(s): Duke of Kenni (father); Daingwun Mingyi U Bo Gyi (adoptive father); Daingwun Mingyi Kadaw (adoptive mother)

Daing Khin Khin (Burmese: ဒိုင်းခင်ခင်; also spelt Dine Khin Khin, born Khin Khin Gyi, circa 1863 – April 1882), also known as Mi Khingyi (Burmese: မိခင်ကြီး), was a Burmese noblewoman and royal concubine of Thibaw Min, the last monarch of the Konbaung dynasty. She became the central figure in a renowned Burmese historical account that narrates a queen's endeavors to ensure fidelity in a reigning monarch.

To marry her, King Thibaw made a solemn promise to ensure her safety within the palace and grant her the royal title of the Queen of the Northern Palace. He swore that if he were to break this promise, he would forfeit his throne, potentially leading to the downfall of the dynasty. The king did not fulfill his promise, and Daing Khin Khin was executed by Supayalat while she was pregnant.

== Background ==
Daing Khin Khin was born into a noble family as the daughter of the Duke and Duchess of Kenni. She was later adopted by Daingwun Mingyi U Bo Gyi and his wife, Daingwun Mingyi Kadaw, who happened to be the sister of the Duke of Kenni. The adoption took place due to Daingwun Mingyi and Daingwun Mingyi Kadaw's inability to have biological children. Daing Khin Khin's paternal lineage traces back to her grandfather, Khanpat Mingyi, who served as the minister of Khanpat. Thanks to her childhood friend Maung Pe Nge's nomination at the palace, she became a lady-in-waiting for Supayalat.

== Life with Thibaw ==
Taungthaman Le-sar Maung Pe Nge and Maung Maung Toke held high positions of great trust in the court of King Thibaw. In an effort to win the king's favor, Maung Maung Toke, who would later become the Lord of Yanaung, introduced the 17-year-old Daing Khin Khin to Thibaw in September 1880, shortly after the birth of Thibaw's first daughter with his chief queen, Supayalat. Following this introduction, King Thibaw expressed a desire to marry Daing Khin Khin, all the while keeping Supayalat in the dark about his intentions, even as she was pregnant with their second child. Maung Pe Nge also harbored a secret affection for Daing Khin Khin, and although her parents had initially consented to their marriage, King Thibaw's command prompted Maung Pe Nge to assist in arranging a relationship with Daing Khin Khin.

Supayalat eventually became aware of the unfolding situation. Following Maung Maung Toke's counsel, Thibaw disregarded the queen's objections and revealed his intention to marry Daing Khin Khin, bestowing upon her the prestigious title of "Queen of the Northern Palace". This revelation greatly angered Supayalat, who had desired a monogamous relationship and saw this as the first instance of the king contradicting her wishes.

Shortly thereafter, Maung Maung Toke, Maung Pe Nge, Daing Khin Khin, and her family faced arrest on orders from the Hluttaw Council, with charges related to an alleged plot to seize the throne. Maung Maung Toke committed suicide, and Maung Pe Nge was sent to Bhamo and subsequently executed. However, before his execution in April 1882, he managed to convey his affection to Daing Khin Khin through a heartfelt poem, beseeching her to observe the obsequies for him. Regrettably, by that time, Daing Khin Khin had already met her demise at the hands of the executioner, despite being pregnant with the child of King Thibaw. Kinwun Mingyi U Kaung had appealed to Supayalat for mercy on the basis that the country would be ruined if the king's only son was killed, but the queen had remained unmoved. This merciless event in Burmese history has cast Supayalat as one of the most notorious figures in Burmese history for her cruelty.

== In popular culture ==
Daing Khin Khin is the subject of Seint's popular eponymous novel Daing Khin Khin, first published in 1976. and khamchan (1996) and Reunkaew (2017), one of the characters in Thai television series, Plerng Phra Nang is based on the historical prototype of Daing Khin Khin.

== See also ==
- Konbaung dynasty
- Thibaw Min
- Supayalat
