= Supayalay =

Burmese queen consort (1863–1912)

- Mibaya Nge
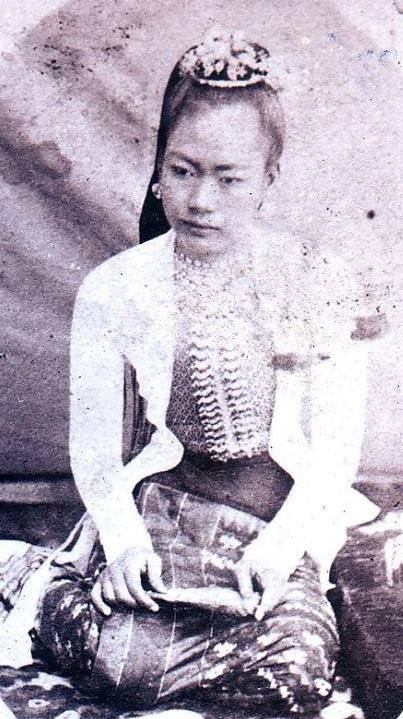
- Supayalay c. 1882

Princess of Yamethin
- Tenure: 1863 – 1878
- Successor: disestablished
- Born: Hteik Supayalay; 1863; Mandalay
- Died: 25 June 1912 (aged 48–49); Ratnagiri, British India
- Spouse: Thibaw Min
Regnal name
- သီရိသုပဘာရတနာဒေဝီ Sīrisupabhāratanādevī
- House: Konbaung
- Father: Mindon Min
- Mother: Hsinbyumashin
- Religion: Theravada Buddhism

Supayalay (Burmese: စုဖုရားလေး; 1863 – 25 June 1912) was a junior queen consort of the Konbaung dynasty, and was married to her half-brother Thibaw Min, the last monarch in the dynasty, in 1878. She was one of the three only queens of King Thibaw.

== Early life ==
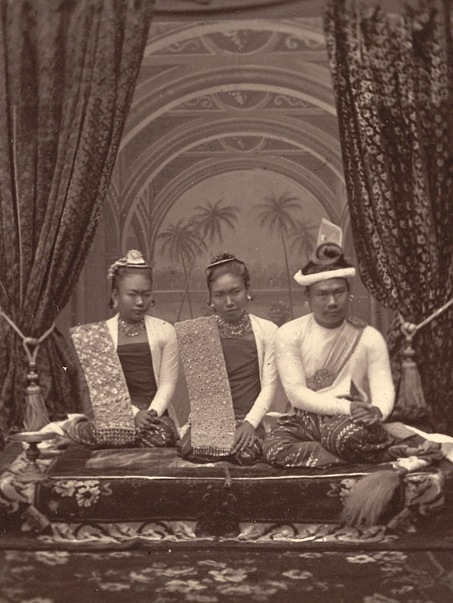
Supayalay next to Queen Supayalat and King Thibaw

Supayalay, born in 1863 at the Royal Palace, in Mandalay as Hteik Supayalay, was the youngest of three daughters between King Mindon and Hsinbyumashin. She was a full-blooded sister of Supayagyi and Supayalat. She received the appanage of Yamethin and was therefore known as the Princess of Yamethin, with the royal title of Sri Suriya Singha Ratna Devi.

Her marriage was never consummated, and Supayalat was said to have forced monogamy on a Burmese king for the first and the last time in history, even though Thibaw also subsequently married her eldest sister Hteik Supayagyi.

== Exile ==
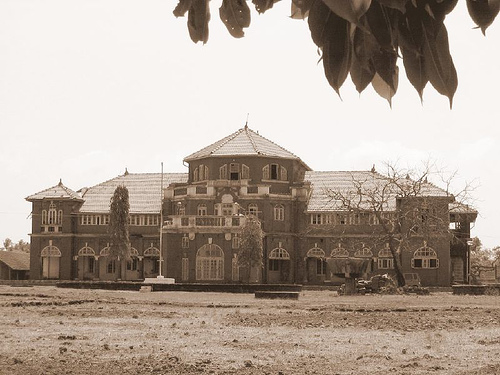
The brick palace in Ratnagiri that Supayalay and the royal family was exiled to

The royal family's reign lasted just seven years when Thibaw Min was defeated in the Third Anglo-Burmese War and forced to abdicate by the British in 1885. On 25 November 1885 they were taken away in a covered carriage, leaving Mandalay Palace by the southern gate of the walled city along the streets lined by British soldiers and their wailing subjects, to the River Irrawaddy where a steamboat called Thuriya (Sun) awaited. They were exiled to the remote coastal town of Ratnagiri in India, where they lived for over 30 years. Her sister Supayagyi and the queen mother were sent to Tavoy (now Dawei). She died on 25 June 1912 at Ratnagiri, India.
