= Supayagyi =

Chief queen consort of Burma from 1878 to 1879

Supayagyi စုဖုရားကြီး
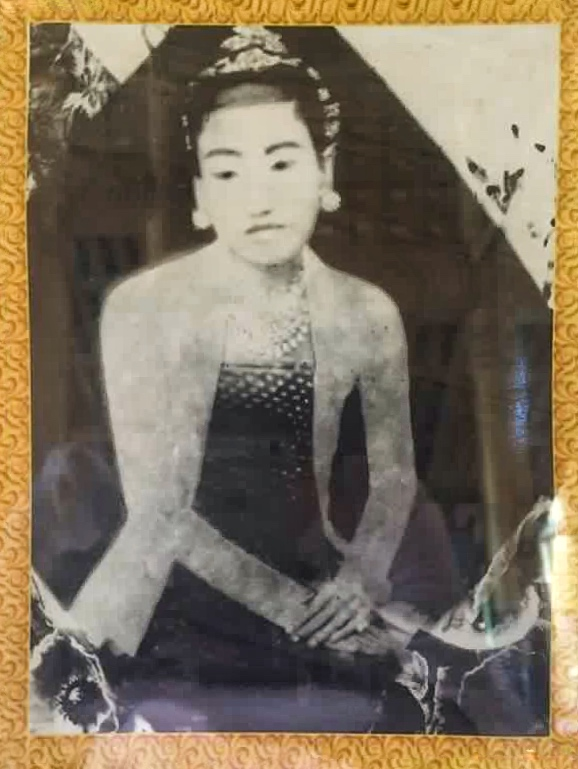
- Supayagyi c. 1879

Chief queen consort of Burma
- Tenure: 30 October 1878 – 12 April 1879
- Predecessor: Thiri Pawara Maha Yazeinda Yadana Dewi
- Successor: Supayalat

Princess of Mong Nawng
- Tenure: 1854 – 1878
- Successor: disestablished
- Born: 1854; Mandalay, Burma
- Died: 25 February 1912 (aged 57–58); Mingun, British Burma
- Burial: Shwedagon Pagoda, Yangon, Myanmar
- Spouse: Thibaw
- Issue: None
- House: Konbaung
- Father: King Mindon
- Mother: Hsinbyumashin
- Religion: Theravada Buddhism

Supayagyi (Burmese: စုဖုရားကြီး; 1854 – 25 February 1912), also spelt Suphayagyi, was the penultimate chief queen consort of the Konbaung dynasty, and was married to Thibaw Min, the last monarch in the dynasty.

== Early life ==
Supayagyi, born in 1854 as Hteiksu Phayagyi (ထိပ်စုဖုရားကြီး), was the eldest of three daughters between King Mindon and Hsinbyumashin. She was a full-blooded sister of Supayalat and Supayalay. She received the appanage of Mong Nawng and was therefore known as the Princess of Mong Nawng, with the royal title of Susīriratanamaṅgaladevī.

== Coronation ==
After placing Thibaw on the throne, the ambitious Hsinbyumashin offered her eldest daughter, Hteik Supayagyi, to be his queen. However, during the royal Aggamahesi coronation, Supayalat pushed her way next to her sister in order to be anointed queen alongside her, thus breaking an ancient royal custom. This resulted in two queens being anointed simultaneously, a situation that had never occurred before in Burmese history. Supayalat's marriage to Thibaw was never consummated, and she is known to have enforced monogamy on a Burmese king for the first and last time in history. However, Thibaw later married Supayalay, Princess of Yamethin, her youngest sister.

== Exile ==
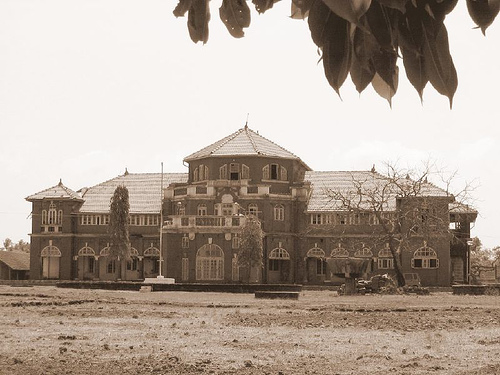
The brick palace in Ratnagiri that Supayagyi and the royal family was exiled to

The royal family's reign lasted just seven years when Thibaw Min was defeated in the Third Anglo-Burmese War and forced to abdicate by the British in 1885. On 25 November 1885 they were taken away in a covered carriage, leaving Mandalay Palace by the southern gate of the walled city along the streets lined by British soldiers and their wailing subjects, to the River Irrawaddy where a steamboat called Thuriya (Sun) awaited. Supayagyi and the queen mother were sent to Tavoy (now Dawei). She died with Buddhist nun life (Thilashin) on 25 February 1912 in Mingun after her mother, who died in 1900. Her remains were interred in the southern section of Shwedagon Pagoda in modern-day Yangon.

== See also ==
- Supayalat
- Thibaw Min
- Konbaung dynasty

Supayagyi Konbaung Dynasty
Royal titles
Preceded by Setkya Dewi	Chief queen consort of Burma; 30 October 1878 - 12 April 1879	Supayalat
