= Supayalat =

Chief queen of Burma from 1879 to 1885

Supayalat စုဖုရားလတ်
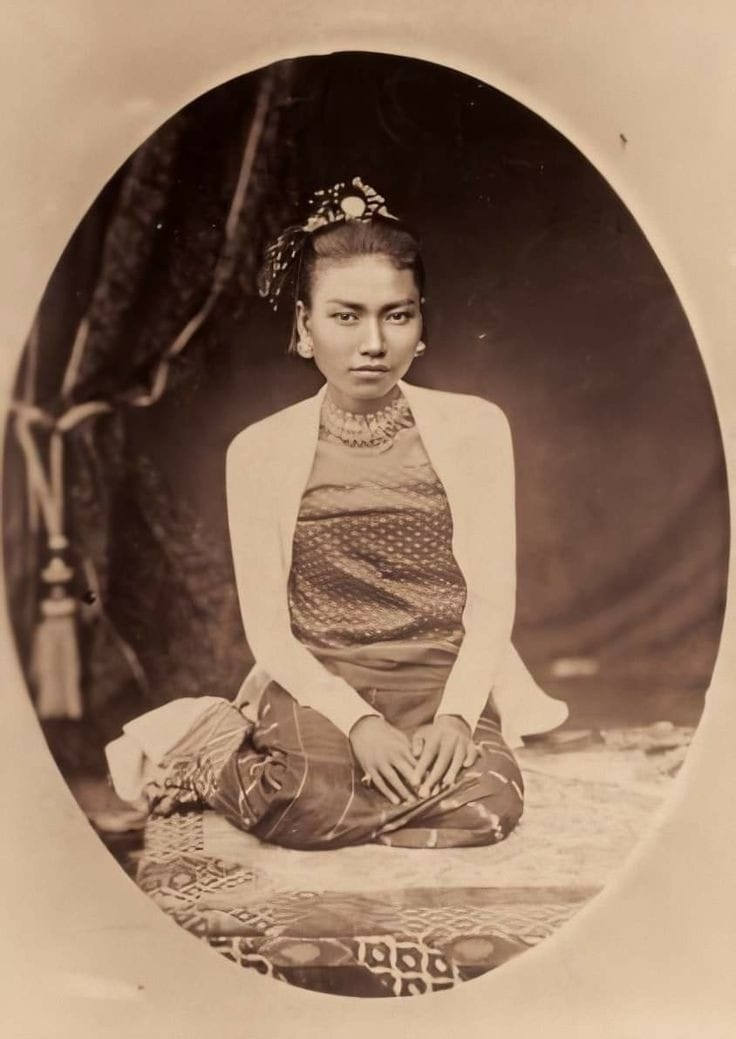
- Supayalat, c. 1880

Chief queen consort of Burma
- Tenure: 12 April 1879 – 29 November 1885
- Predecessor: Supayagyi
- Successor: Title abolished

Queen of the Northern Palace
- Tenure: 18 November 1878 – 12 April 1879
- Predecessor: Thiri Maha Yadana Mingala Dewi
- Successor: Title abolished

Princess of Myadaung, Tabayin and Manle
- Tenure: 1859 – 1878
- Successor: Title abolished
- Born: 13 December 1859; Mandalay, Burma
- Died: 24 November 1925 (aged 65); Rangoon, British Burma
- Burial: Kandawmin Garden Mausolea
- Spouse: Thibaw
- Issue: 1 son, 4 daughters: Myat Phaya Gyi; Myat Phaya Lat; Myat Phaya; Myat Phaya Galay
Names
- Sīri Pavara Tiloka Maṅgala Mahā Ratanā Devī (သီရိပဝရတိလောကမင်္ဂလာမဟာရတနာဒေဝီ)
- House: Konbaung
- Father: King Mindon
- Mother: Hsinbyumashin
- Religion: Theravada Buddhism

Supayalat (Burmese: စုဖုရားလတ်, pronounced [sṵpʰəjá laʔ]; 13 December 1859 – 24 November 1925), also spelt Suphayalat, was the last queen of Burma who reigned in Mandalay (1878–1885), born to King Mindon Min and Queen of Alenandaw (lit. 'Middle Palace'; also known as Hsinbyumashin or Lady of the White Elephant). She was married to her half-brother, Thibaw, who became the last king of the Konbaung dynasty in 1878, upon Mindon Min's death. She is best known for engineering a massacre of 80 to 100 royal family members, to prevent potential rivals from usurping Thibaw's power, although she had always denied any knowledge of the plot, which may have been hatched by her mother together with some of the ministers, including the chancellor Kinwun Mingyi U Kaung.

King Thibaw was known for his reliance on Supayalat. Although Thibaw was king, many historians say it was Supayalat who actually ruled the country. The bloody coup that brought her and Thibaw to power associated her name with cruelty, brutality and barbarity. As a greatest achievement of Supayalat, she changed the royal tradition of polygamy to monogamy on a Burmese king for the first and the last time in history and never allowed Thibaw to take another woman as a consort. Supayalat executed Daing Khin Khin, the secret concubine of King Thibaw, even though she was pregnant.

In Burmese history, Supayalat is remembered for her ego, cruelty, and excessive pride, serving as the figure held responsible for the kingdom's fall into the hands of the imperialists. She became the embodiment of a Burmese proverb: "A woman can bring ruin to a kingdom" (မိန်းမဖျက် ပြည်ပျက်).

== Early life ==
Supayalat was born on 13 December 1859 at the Royal Palace, in Mandalay as Hteik Supayalat, was the second of three daughters of King Mindon and Hsinbyumashin. She was a full-blooded sister of Supayagyi and Supayalay. She received the appanage of Tabayin, Manle and later Myadaung, and was therefore known as the Princess of Myadaung, with the royal title of Sīri Suriya Prabha Ratanā Devī (သီရိသူရိယပြဘရတနာဒေဝိ). She attained the top position among King Mindon's daughters as the firstborn following the establishment of Mandalay Palace.

Hsinbyumashin had planned to arrange a marriage between Thibaw and her eldest daughter, Supayagyi, not Supayalat, but Thibaw declared his love for Supayalat.

== Self-anointed queen ==
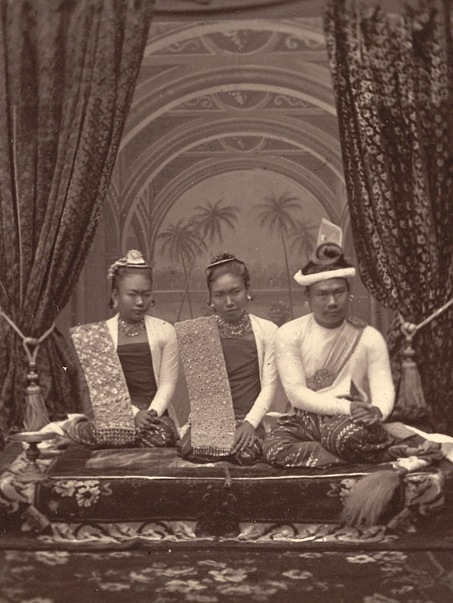
Junior Queen Supayalay next to Queen Supayalat and King Thibaw

The three other queens of Mindon had no children, and Hsinbyumashin became more powerful after the death of the chief queen Setkya Dewi. Thibaw, on the other hand, was the son of a middle-ranking queen, Laungshe Mibaya. He was however learned in the Buddhist scriptures and also educated by the missionary Dr Marks, and became one of Mindon's favourite sons.

In 1878, Thibaw succeeded his father in a succession massacre. Hsinbyumashin, one of Mindon's queens, had grown dominant at the Mandalay court during Mindon's final days. Under the guise that Mindon wanted to bid his children (other princes and princesses) farewell, Hsinbyumashin had all royals of close age (who could potentially be heir to the throne) killed by edict, to ensure that Thibaw and her oldest daughter Hteik Supayagyi would assume the throne.

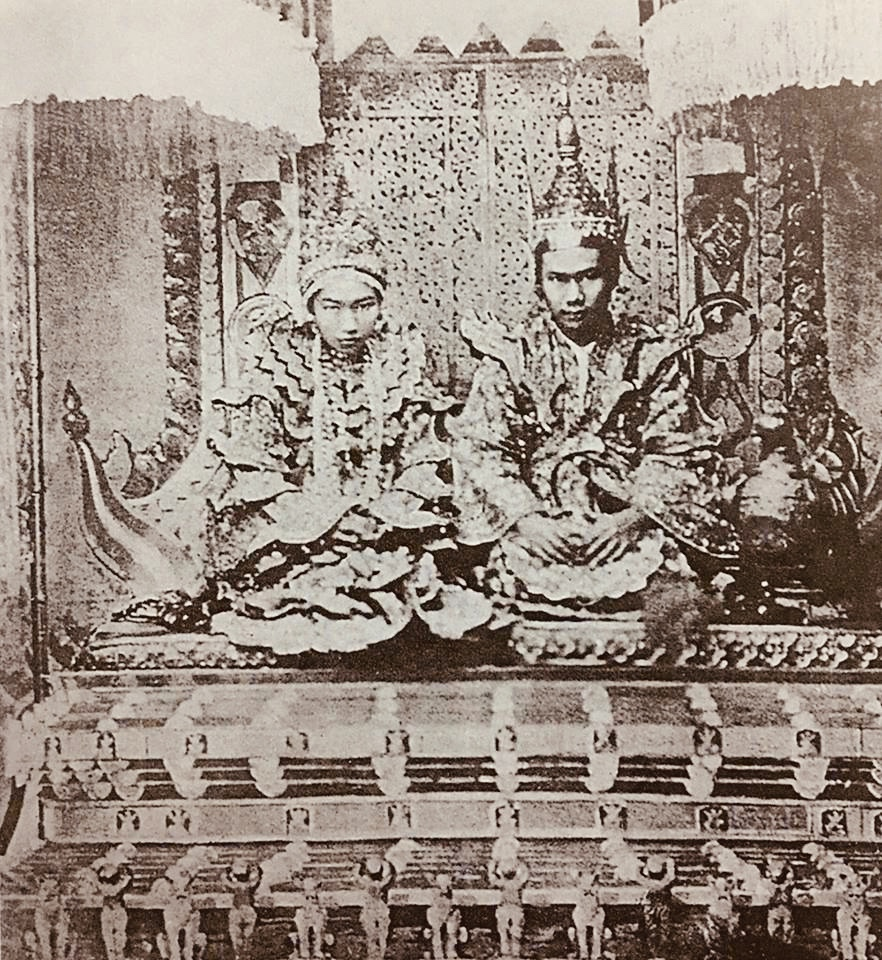
King Thibaw and Queen Supayalat on the Bumblebee Throne (Palin) at Glass Hall, Mandalay Palace

The ambitious Hsinbyumashin, after putting Thibaw on the throne, offered Supayagyi to be his queen, but during the royal wedding ceremony Supayalat pushed in next to her sister to be anointed queen at the same time, breaking ancient custom. Her sister's marriage was never consummated, and Supayalat was said to have forced monogamy on a Burmese king for the first and the last time in history, even though Thibaw also subsequently married her youngest sister Hteik Supayalay, Princess of Yamethin. Supayalat was 19 and Thibaw 20 when they ascended the lion throne (Thihathana palin). Many historians and media accused Supayalat of also engineering the massacre, but she denied this:

"I was a teenager at the time and too young to undertake such an inhuman act. The massacre must have been organized by ministers and officials."

— Supayalat

She advocated for war with the British and consistently rejected any peace process with them. As U Kaung journeyed across the globe, he witnessed the might of the British military firsthand. When he implored King Thibaw at the royal court to avoid conflict with the British, Supayalat replied:

"This old man is always timid. He should wear a woman's htamein. Sent a htamein and a thanaka grinding stone to U Kaung's house this evening."

— Supayalat

She resisted efforts by reformist ministers to limit royal authority, particularly in matters related to royal spending. Western historians have documented that Queen Supayalat often rewarded her favorite servants, court musicians, dancers, and entertainers with significant amounts of gold and jewelry.

"She used to generously reward people she liked, and in doing so, she would order that the person receiving the favor should take about a handful of jewels in each hand."

— The Pagoda War (page: 65)

== Exile ==
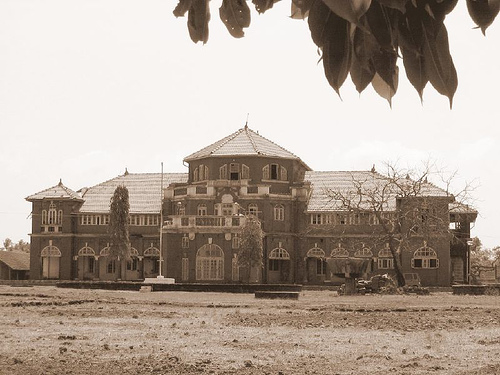
The brick palace in Ratnagiri that Queen Supayalat and the royal family was exiled to

Their reign had lasted seven years when Thibaw Min was defeated in the Third Anglo-Burmese War and forced to abdicate by the British in 1885. On 25 November 1885 they were taken away in a covered carriage, leaving Mandalay Palace by the southern gate of the walled city along the streets lined by British soldiers and their wailing subjects, to the River Irrawaddy where a steamboat called Thuriya (Sun) awaited. Thibaw was 27 and Supayalat 26.

Supayalat never lost her composure, and was said to have asked a British soldier by the wayside for a light to smoke a Burmese cheroot. She was pregnant and accompanied by her husband, their two daughters, her two sisters, and her mother; the rest of their party followed on foot. The troops had nicknamed her "Soup Plate", and in the commotion and haste that attended their abduction, some of the crown jewels disappeared including a large ruby called Nga Mauk that Colonel Sladen had insisted on being handed over for safekeeping. Thibaw saw an opportunity in 1911 when King George V visited India, and wrote for the return of the Burmese crown jewels, but only received a reply that Col. Sladen had died in 1890. Nga Mauk was believed to have subsequently turned up as the largest ruby on the British crown; it was recognised by Princess of Kyundaung in whose charge the ruby used to be.

On 10 December 1885 the royal family, minus the queen mother and Supayagyi who were sent to Dawei, was taken to Madras where their third daughter was born, and in April the next year they were moved to Ratnagiri on the west coast where they could no longer look across the Bay of Bengal to the land they had been forced to leave. Supayalat gave birth to her fourth and youngest daughter in 1887; they were not given a proper residence commensurate with their status until 1911 when Thibaw Palace was built by the government. In 1914 the royal princesses had an ear-piercing ceremony (နားသွင်းမင်္ဂလာ nahtwin mingala) according to Burmese custom. Some of the family members, court officials and entertainers including the famous orchestra of Sein Beida and the harpist Deiwa Einda Maung Maung Gyi from Burma were permitted to attend the ceremony. Although Supayalat's first born was a boy he did not survive infancy, and she had also lost another daughter.

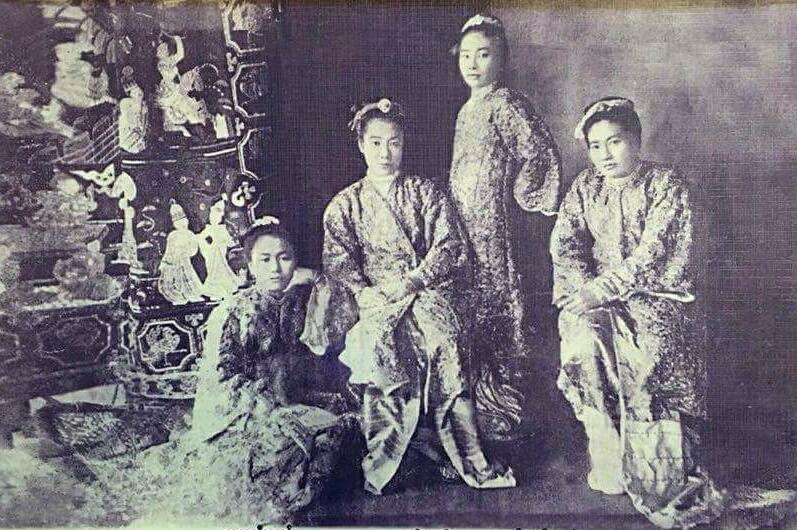
The four daughters of King Thibaw and Supayalat, Myat Phaya Galay, Myat Phaya Gyi, Myat Phaya Lat, Myat Phaya

The royal princesses were named as follows:

1. Hteiksu Myat Phaya Gyi (1880–1947) married an Indian door guard at Thibaw Palace. She had a daughter named Tu Tu.
2. Hteiksu Myat Phaya Lat (1882–1956) married a Burmese courtier Khin Maung Lat; neither of these unions met with the royal parents' approval.
3. Hteiksu Myat Phaya aka Madras Supaya (1886–1962) returned to Burma with her mother, and married a grandson of Kanaung Mintha, her great-uncle and brother of King Mindon.
4. Hteiksu Myat Phaya Galay (1887–1935), the youngest and brightest, was fluent in English and acted as the royal family's spokesperson airing their grievances in a document called Sadutta thamidaw ayeidawbon sadan (စတုတ္ထသမီးတော်အရေးတော်ပုံစာတမ်း The Fourth Royal Daughter Crisis Document); she was sent away by the colonial government to live in Moulmein where she spent the rest of her days.

== Return ==
Supayagyi, who had remained childless, looked after her four royal nieces, and died in 1912. When King Thibaw died in 1916 at the age of 58 after 30 years in exile, Supayalat fought in vain for the right to take her husband's body back to be buried with proper funeral rites in Burma. She refused to give up the bodies of both her sister and her husband, buried in the grounds of their palace, to the authorities who eventually took them by force to be buried in Ratnagiri in 1919. The queen did not attend the funeral although she did send two of the royal princesses to the ceremony. The tombs of the king and Supayalay were later joined by that of Pahtama thamidaw (First Royal Daughter) who died in 1947.

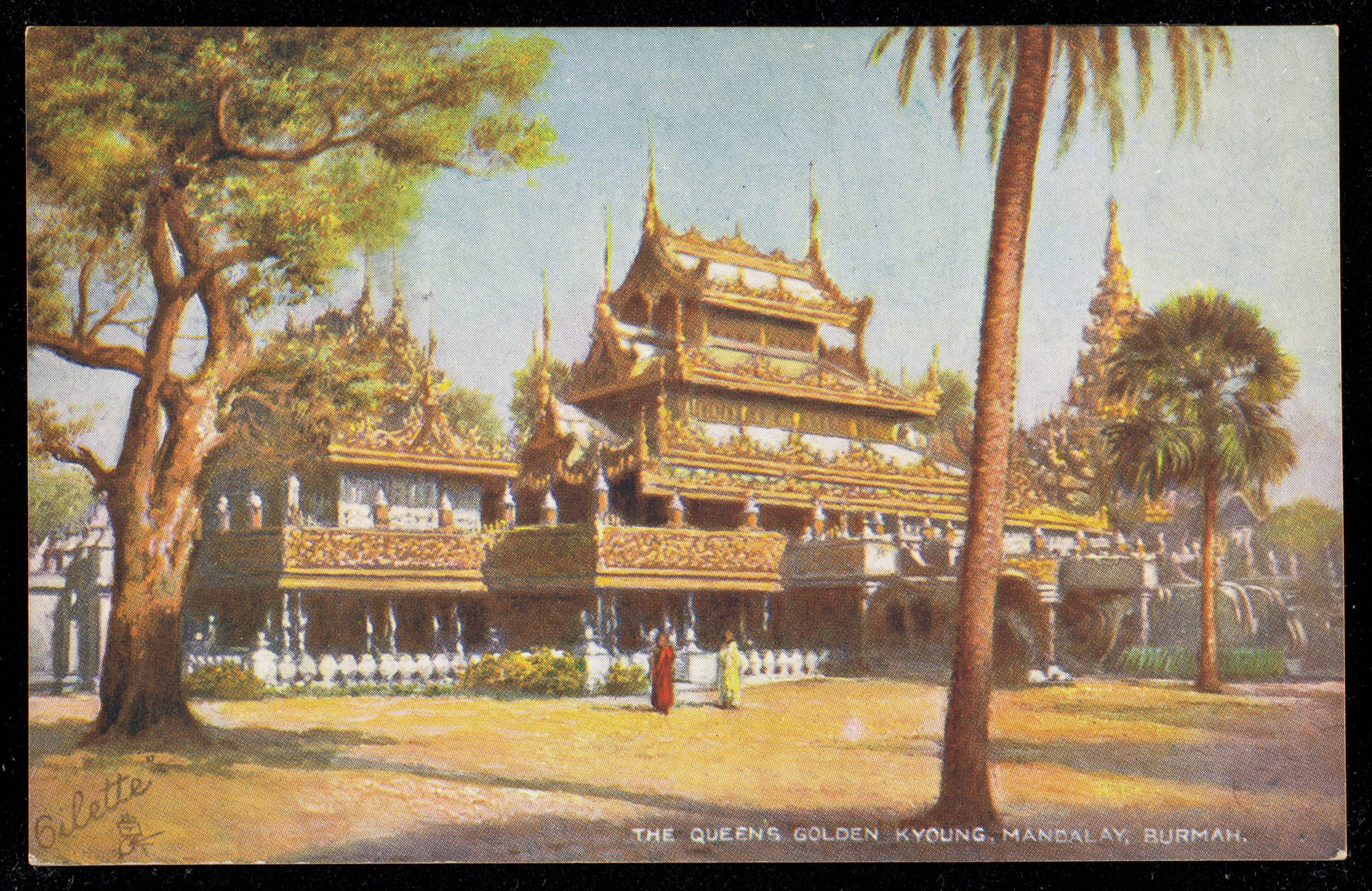
Myadaung Monastery

Supayalat returned to Rangoon in 1919, confining her under house arrest. She was never allowed to leave her home, which was under constant observation by the police. While confined to her residence, Supayalat upheld the longstanding traditions of the Burmese court, with the Queen positioned above her guests and servants gliding around the room on their stomachs. She had lived on a pension and in her last days her closest adviser was Thakin Kodaw Hmaing, the great writer and nationalist leader, who revered her for her defiant stand against colonialism and who had witnessed at the age of nine the fall of the monarchy and the abduction of the royal couple in Mandalay.

At the time of her return to Burma, the country was in the grip of nationalist fervor. She became a focus of anti-colonial and nationalist sentiment. Hmaing founded the Protection Committee for the Queen, with other nationalists. The committee pressed the British government to improve Suphayalat's living conditions and provide her with a small allowance. Hmaing was a boarder at Myadaung Monastery built by the queen who never had the chance to conduct an opening ceremony (yeizetcha, literally "pour drops of water", in order to call on the goddess of earth to witness the good deed) as it had only been recently completed.

Supayalat disdained British rule to the end, never regarded herself as beholden to the British who she believed robbed her of her kingdom with all the wealth and riches therein. She shunned British products and any association with her country's colonial rulers. Only a few British visitors were welcomed into her presence—among them, the British author Noel Whiting, who sympathized with the Burmese nationalist cause.

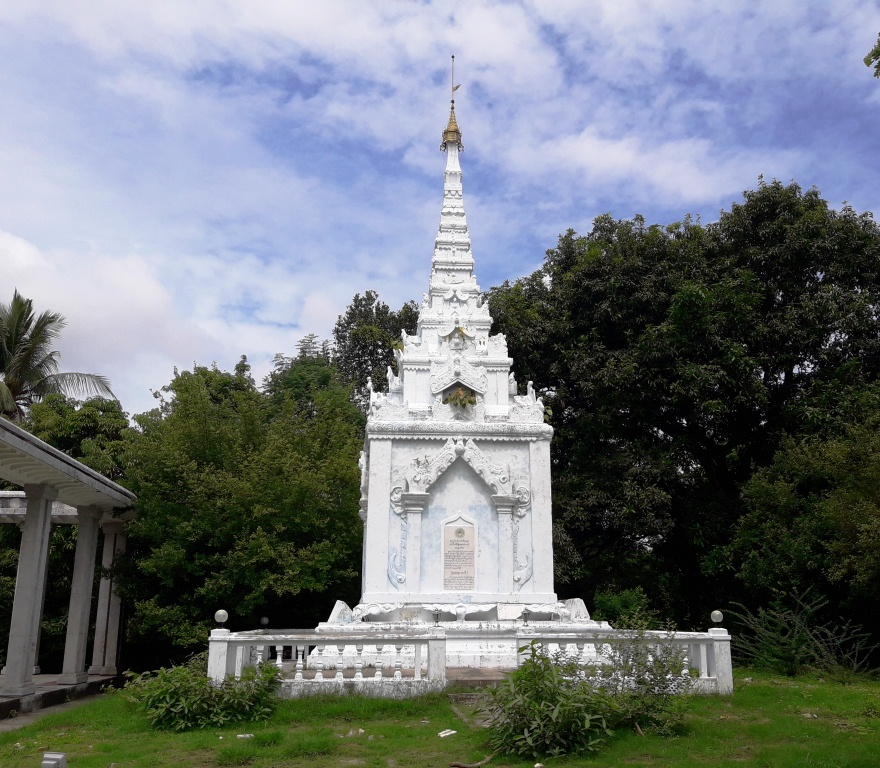
Supayalat's mausoleum on Shwedagon Pagoda Road, Yangon

She died from a heart attack in 1925, just before her 66th birthday. Although the colonial government declared the day of her funeral a national holiday, the royal family's request for her to be buried in Mandalay was also refused. Her funeral was, however, held with pomp and ceremony as befitted a Burmese queen, organised by the Saophas of Yaunghwe and Thibaw. Her body lay in state, shielded under eight white royal umbrellas, attended by 90 Buddhist monks and the British governor Sir Harcourt Butler with a guard of honour of the Mounted Police complete with a 30 gun salute.

Supayalat is buried at Kandawmin Garden Mausolea.

== In popular culture ==
=== Literature ===
- The Lacquer Lady - a novel by F. Tennyson Jesse
- The Glass Palace - a novel by Amitav Ghosh
- The City of Gem - a novel by Joanna Trollope
- Mandalay - a poem by Rudyard Kipling

=== Films ===
- Portrayed by Wassana Poonpol and Tussaneeya Karnsomnut in the 1996 and 2017 versions, respectively, Thai soap opera Plerng Phra Nang, under the character name Princess Pinmanee. It was loosely based on Supayalat's life and some Burmese cultures and traditions are used in drama
- Portrayed by Chamaiporn Jaturaput and Patcharin Judrabounpol in the 2000 and 2017 versions, respectively, Thai television drama Rak Nakara, under the character name Queen Pattamasuda
- Portrayed by Cho Thin in 1997 film Never Shall We Be Enslaved.
- Mentioned in the 2018 romance/comedy drama film Crazy Rich Asians, where her jewellery was bought by Astrid.

Supayalat Konbaung dynasty Born: 13 December 1859 Died: 24 November 1925
Royal titles
Preceded by Supayagyi	Chief queen consort of Burma; 12 April 1879 – 29 November 1885	Konbaung dynasty abolished
Preceded by Thiri Maha Yadana Mingala Dewi	Queen of the Northern Palace; 18 November 1878 – 12 April 1879	None
