= Myadaung =

Myadaung မြတောင်
- Village
- Myadaung
- Location in Myanmar
- Coordinates: 23°43′48″N 96°09′20″E
- Country: Myanmar
- Region: Sagaing
- District: Katha District
- Township: Htigyaing Township
- Village tract: Myadaung
- Time zone: UTC+6.30 (MST)

Myadaung (Burmese: မြတောင်; lit. 'emerald hill') is a village in Htigyaing Township, Katha District, Sagaing Region. Myadaung was a historical town and district during the Konbaung era with a significant number of historical interests. Located on the east side of the Irrawaddy River, there are more than a thousand houses.

== History ==
The town was originally called Myasin-taung (lit. 'emerald elephant hill') after an elephant which frequented a hill in the neighbourhood. Myadaung was the fief of Queen Supayalat, the last queen of Burma, during her youth. It existed as a town during the monarchy days, but during the British rule, it was incorporated as a village into the Htigyaing Township. Myadaing was one of the 43 patrol towns that were established near the Irrawaddy River during the reign of King Anawrahta of Pagan. The Htigyaing township in Konbaung period was in the jurisdiction of the Myadaung wun (minister of Myadaung), and was called the Myadaung township. It formed until 1802 a part of the Myadaung subdivision, which was then in Katha district, but since that year Myadaung has been made over to Ruby Mines district and Htigyaing joined to the Katha subdivision.

During the reign of King Mindon, the myoza (count) of Myadaung was Mingyi Maha Nawyata, who against the rebellion of the Sawbwa of Momeik.

During the Myanmar civil war, the Kachin Independence Army attacked and captured the village in August 2024.
