= Myat Phaya =

- H.R.H. Princess Ashin Hteik Suhpaya Mayat Phaya
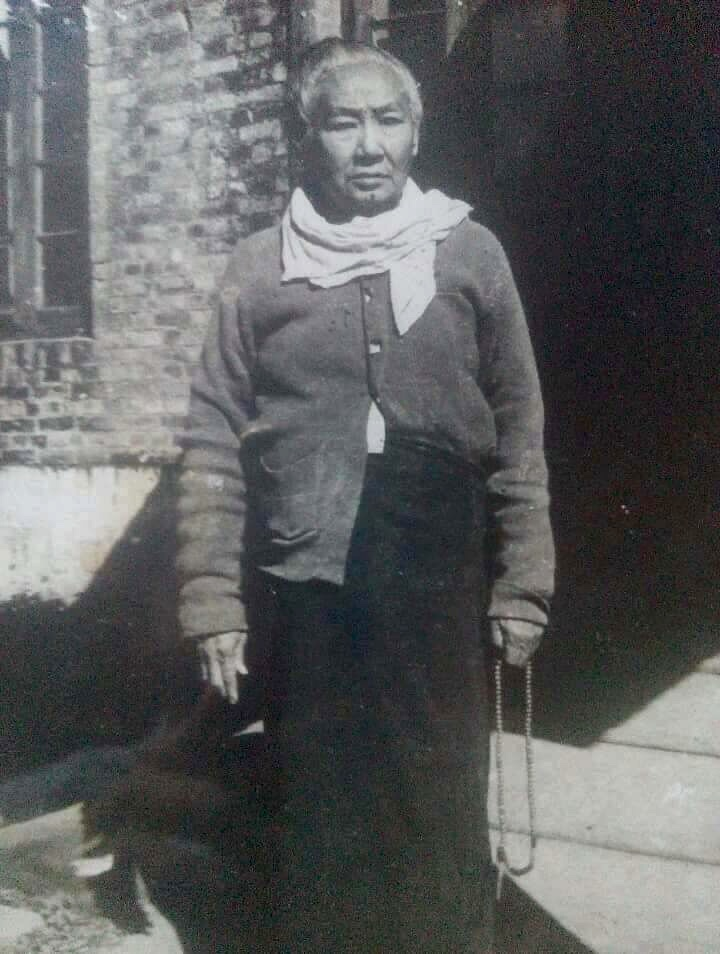
- Myat Phaya at her residence Maymyo

Head of the Royal House of Konbaung
- Tenure: 24 November 1956 – 21 July 1962
- Predecessor: Myat Phaya Lat
- Successor: Taw Phaya
- Born: 7 March 1886; Madras, Madras Presidency, British Raj
- Died: 21 July 1962 (aged 76); Maymyo, Burma
- Spouse: Hteik Tin Kodawgyi (m. 1921; div. 1930) Mya U (m. 1931; died 1943)
- Issue: Hteik Su Gyi Phaya
- House: Royal House of Konbaung
- Father: Thibaw Min
- Mother: Supayalat
- Religion: Theravada Buddhism

Princess Myat Phaya (Burmese: ထိပ်စုမြတ်ဖုရား; born in Madras at 7 March 1886 – 21 July 1962), was a Burmese royal princess and Head of the Royal House of Konbaung. She was the third daughter of the last ruling king of Burma, King Thibaw and his queen Supayalat.

== Biography ==
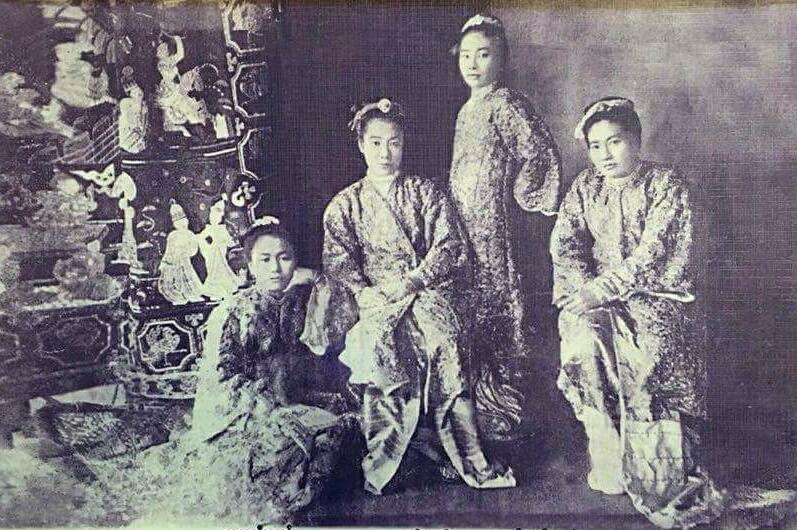
The four daughters of King Thibaw, Myat Phaya Galay, Myat Phaya Gyi, Myat Phaya Lat, Myat Phaya

Myat Phaya was born on 7 March 1886 at Madras, British India. She returned to Burma from Ratnagiri in 1915. Later, she had served as Patron of the King Thibaw Funeral Committee in 1949, and the association for Buddhism as the National Religion in 1958.

Myat Phaya married her first husband, Prince Hteik Tin Kodawgyi, in 1921 and divorced him in 1930. He was the son of Maung Maung Thaung, by his wife Princess (Hteik Hteik Hkaung-tin) Aye, the Princess of War Nwe Gone, daughter of Crown prince Kanaung Mintha. She gave birth to their only daughter, Phaya Rita, also known as Hteik Su Gyi Phaya who married her cousin Taw Phaya, a son of the Princess Myat Phaya Galay.

Myat Phaya married her second husband, Mya U (who died during the Japanese occupation), a lawyer, on 25 June 1931. She died from cancer on 21 July 1962 at her home in Maymyo.

Myat Phaya Konbaung Dynasty Born: 7 March 1886
Royal titles
Preceded by Myat Phaya Lat	Heir to the Burmese Throne; 1956 – 1962	Succeeded by Taw Phaya
