= Myat Phaya Lat =

- H.R.H. Princess Ashin Hteik Suhpaya Mayat Phaya Lat
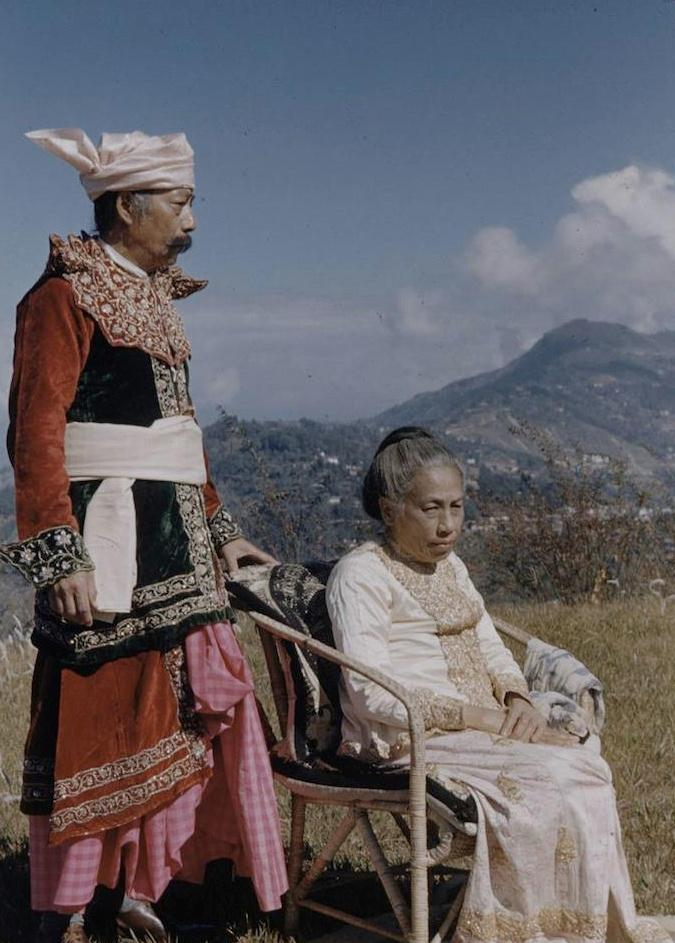
- Mayat Phaya Lat and her husband Khin Maung Lat, photograph by James Cobb Burke, c. 1953

Head of the Royal House of Konbaung
- Tenure: 19 December 1916 – 4 April 1956
- Predecessor: Thibaw Min
- Successor: Myat Phaya
- Born: 4 October 1883; Royal Palace, Burma
- Died: 4 April 1956 (aged 72); Kalimpong, West Bengal, India
- Spouse: Khin Maung Lat (m. 1917; died 1955)
- Issue: Maung Lu Gyi (adopted son)
- Father: Thibaw Min
- Mother: Supayalat
- Religion: Theravada Buddhism

Princess Myat Phaya Lat (Burmese: မြတ်ဘုရားလတ်, pronounced [mjaʔ pʰəjá laʔ]; 4 October 1883 – 4 April 1956) was a Burmese royal princess and most senior member of the Royal House of Konbaung. She was the Royal Householder after the death of her father, King Thibaw while in exile in 1916.

== Biography ==
Myat Phaya Lat was born on 4 October 1883 at the Royal Palace, Mandalay. She was the second daughter of King Thibaw by his chief queen Supayalat.

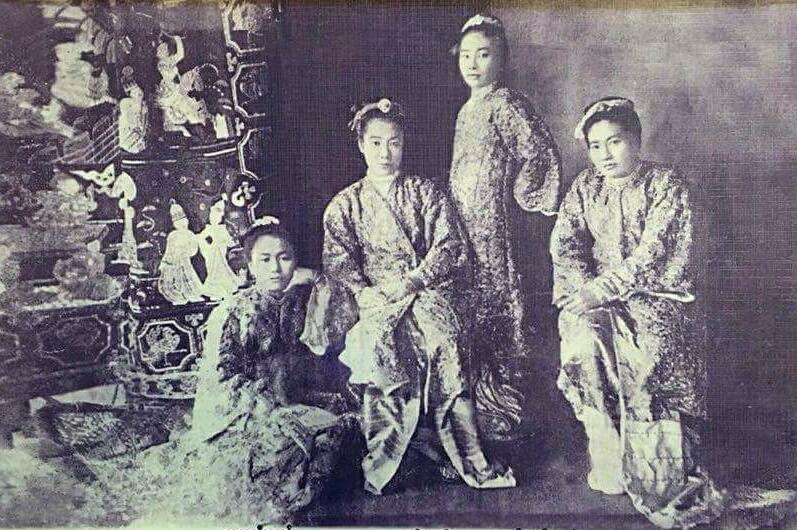
The four daughters of King Thibaw, Myat Phaya Galay, Myat Phaya Gyi, Myat Phaya Lat, Myat Phaya

The princess was married on 20 February 1917 at the Collector's Bungalow, Ratnagiri, Bombay, India, to Khin Maung Lat (Burma Raja Sahib), Private Secretary to Ex-King Thibaw, sometime Officer in the Indian Police, a nephew of King Thibaw and son of the Duke and Duchess of Ngape and Mindat. She died on 4 April 1956 at Kalimpong, India, having adopted the son of her Nepalese maidservant, named Maung Lu Gy.

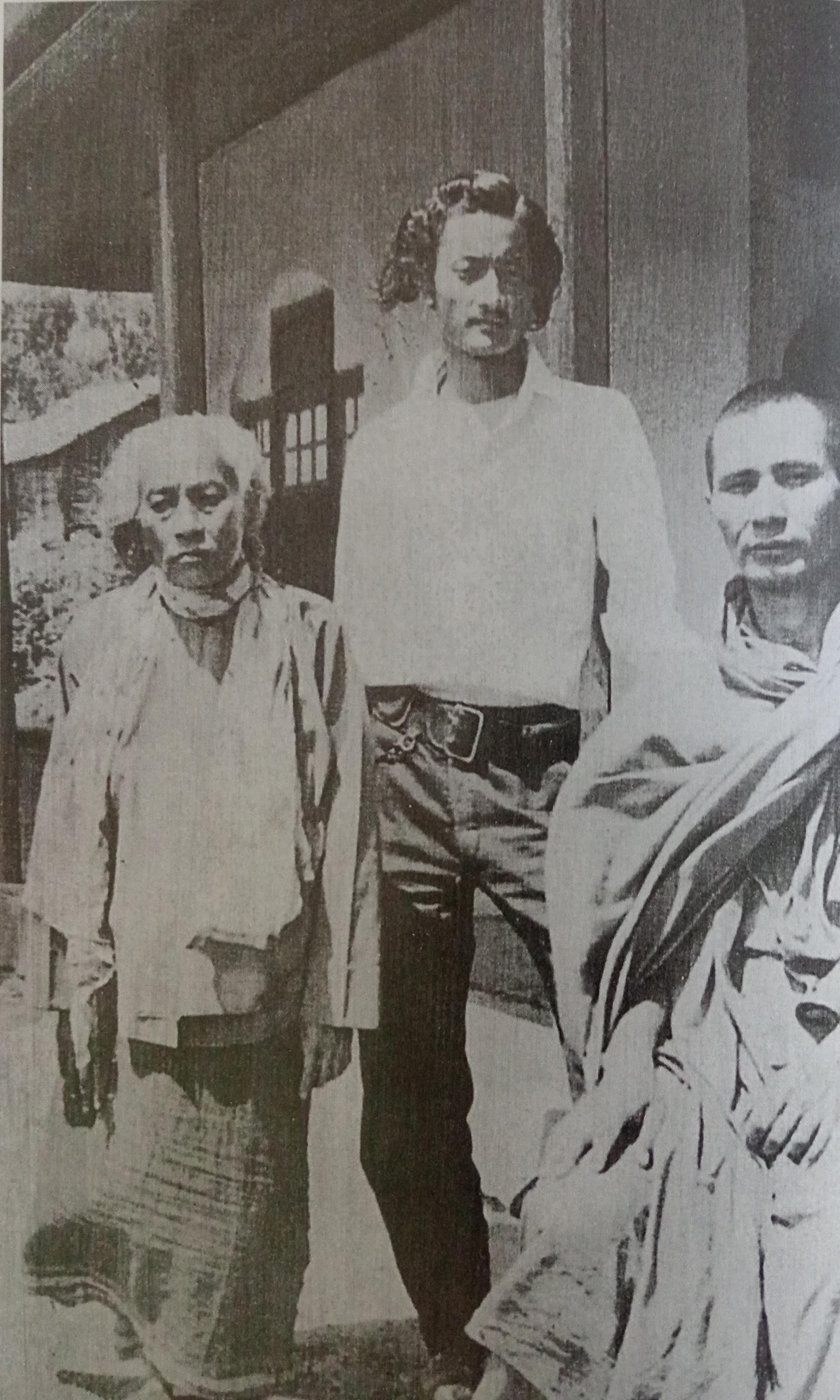
Princess Myat Phaya Lat with her son Maung Lu Ji and a Burmese monk who returned to Burma with her in 1956.

Myat Phaya Lat Konbaung Dynasty Born: 4 October 1883
Royal titles
Preceded by Thibaw Min	Heir to the Burmese Throne; 1916 – 1956	Succeeded by Myat Phaya
