= Thibaw Min =

King of Burma from 1878 to 1885

Thibaw Min သီပေါ‌မင်း
- King of Konbaung, Prince of Hsipaw, Hsipaw King
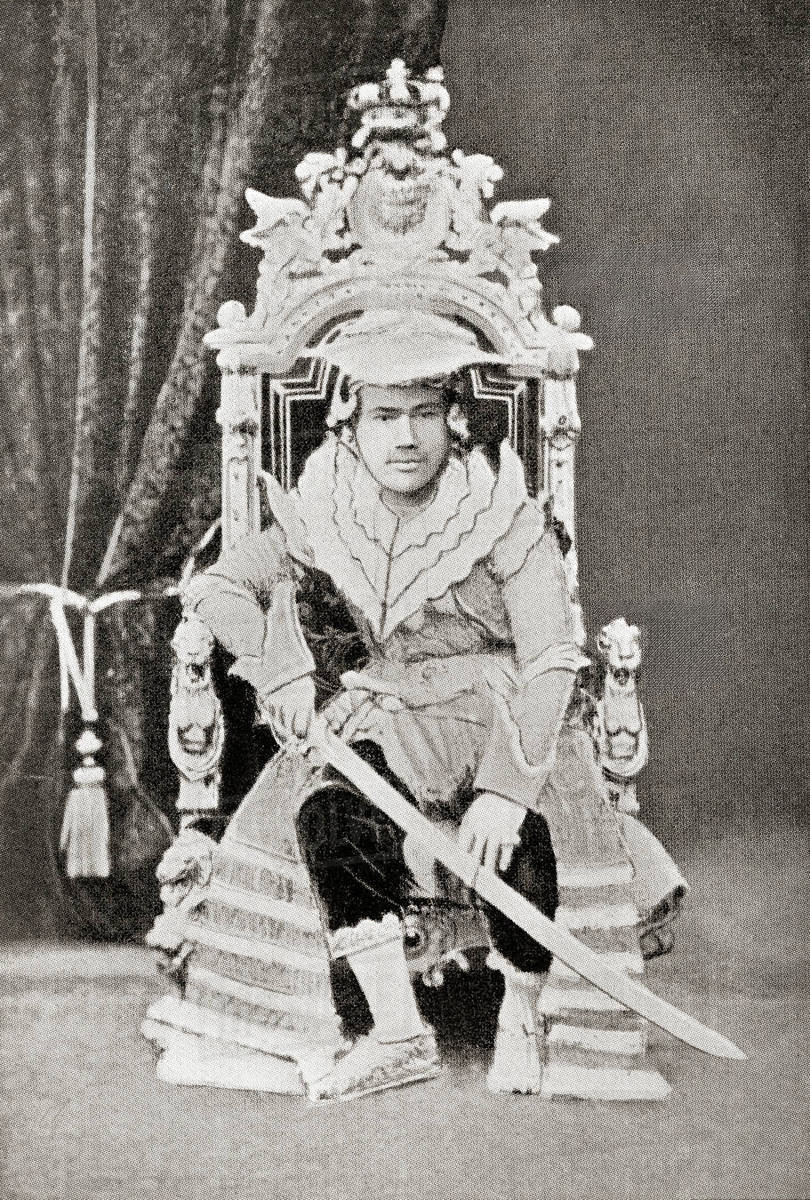
- Thibaw, c. 1886

King of Burma
- Reign: 1 October 1878 – 29 November 1885
- Coronation: 6 November 1878
- Predecessor: Mindon Min
- Successor: Monarchy abolished
- Prime Minister: Kinwun Mingyi U Kaung
- Born: Maung Yay Set (မောင်ရေစက်); 1 January 1859; Wednesday, 10th waxing of Nadaw 1220 ME; Mandalay, Burma
- Died: 16 December 1916 (aged 57); Saturday, 7th waning of Nadaw 1278 ME; Ratnagiri, Bombay State, British India
- Burial: Ratnagiri, India
- Spouse: Supayagyi; Supayalat; Supayalay
- Issue Detail: 1 son, 4 daughters, including: Myat Phaya Gyi; Myat Phaya Lat; Myat Phaya; Myat Phaya Galay
Regnal name
- Siripavara Vijayānanta Yasatiloka Dhipati Paṇḍita Mahādhammarājadhirāja (သိရီပဝရ ဝိဇယာနန္တ ယသတိလောကာ ဓိပတိ ပဏ္ဍိတ မဟာဓမ္မရာဇာဓိရာဇာ)
- House: Konbaung
- Father: Mindon Min
- Mother: Laungshe Mibaya
- Religion: Theravada Buddhism

Thibaw Min, also Thebaw (Burmese: သီပေါ‌မင်း, pronounced [θìbɔ́ mɪ́ɰ̃]; 1 January 1859 – 16 December 1916), was the last king of the Konbaung dynasty of Burma (Myanmar) and also the last Burmese monarch in the country's history. His reign ended when the Royal Burmese armed forces were defeated by the forces of the British Empire in the Third Anglo-Burmese War, on 29 November 1885, prior to its official annexation on 1 January 1886.

== Early life ==
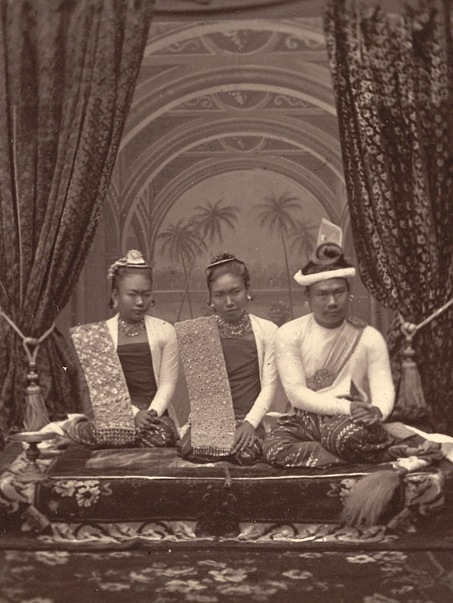
A photograph of King Thibaw and his wives, half-sisters Supayalat and Supayalay (November 1885)

Prince Thibaw was born Maung Yay Set (Burmese: မောင်ရေစက်), the son of King Mindon (r. 1853–1878) and one of his consorts, Laungshe Mibaya. Thibaw's mother had been banished from the palace court by Mindon and spent her final years as a thilashin, a kind of female Burmese Buddhist renunciant. During the early years of his life, Thibaw studied Buddhist texts at a kyaung to win his father's favor. He passed the Pahtamabyan religious examinations and gained respect and recognition from his father and from the chief queen.

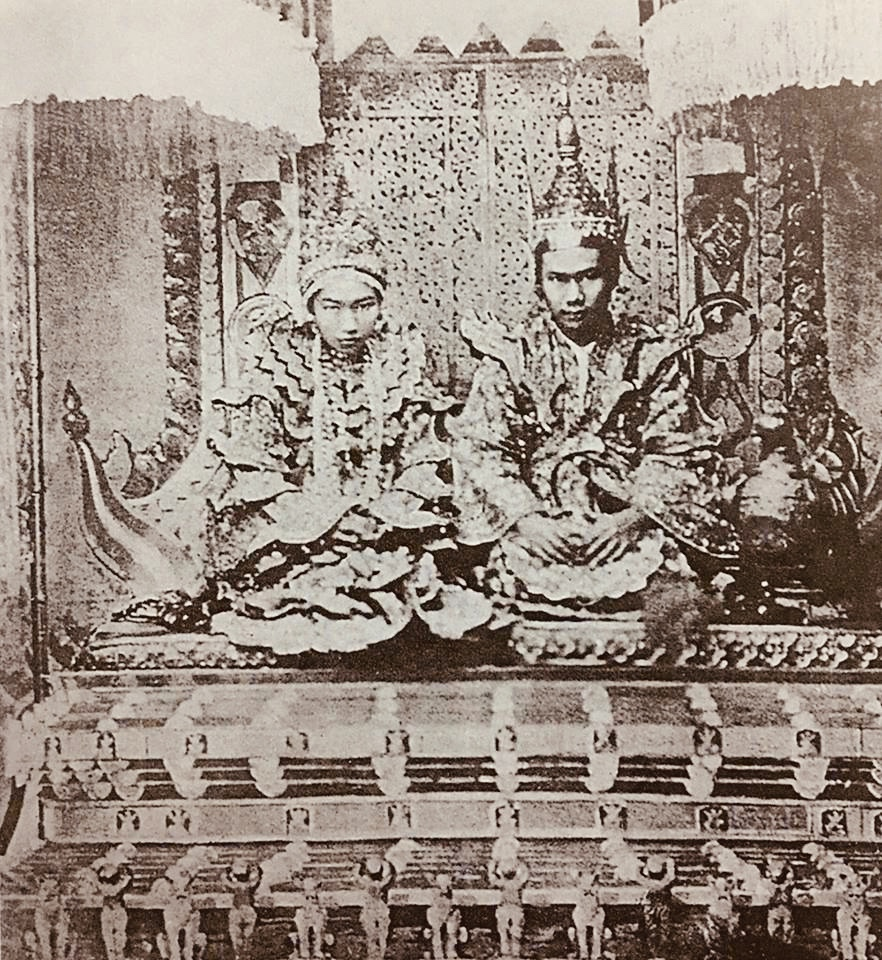
King Thibaw and Queen Supayalat on the Bumblebee Throne (Palin) at Glass Hall, Mandalay Palace

One of Mindon's chief consorts, the Queen of the Middle Palace, Hsinbyumashin, helped to broker a marriage between her eldest daughter, Supayagyi and Thibaw, who were half-siblings by blood.

== Accession ==
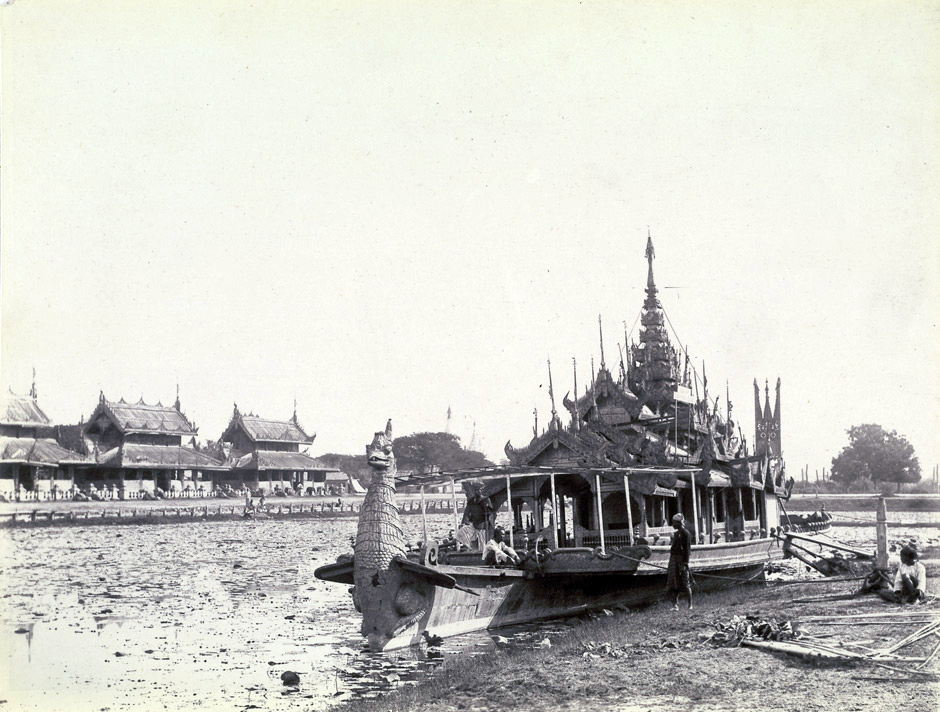
King Thibaw's Royal Barge on the Mandalay Palace moat in 1885.

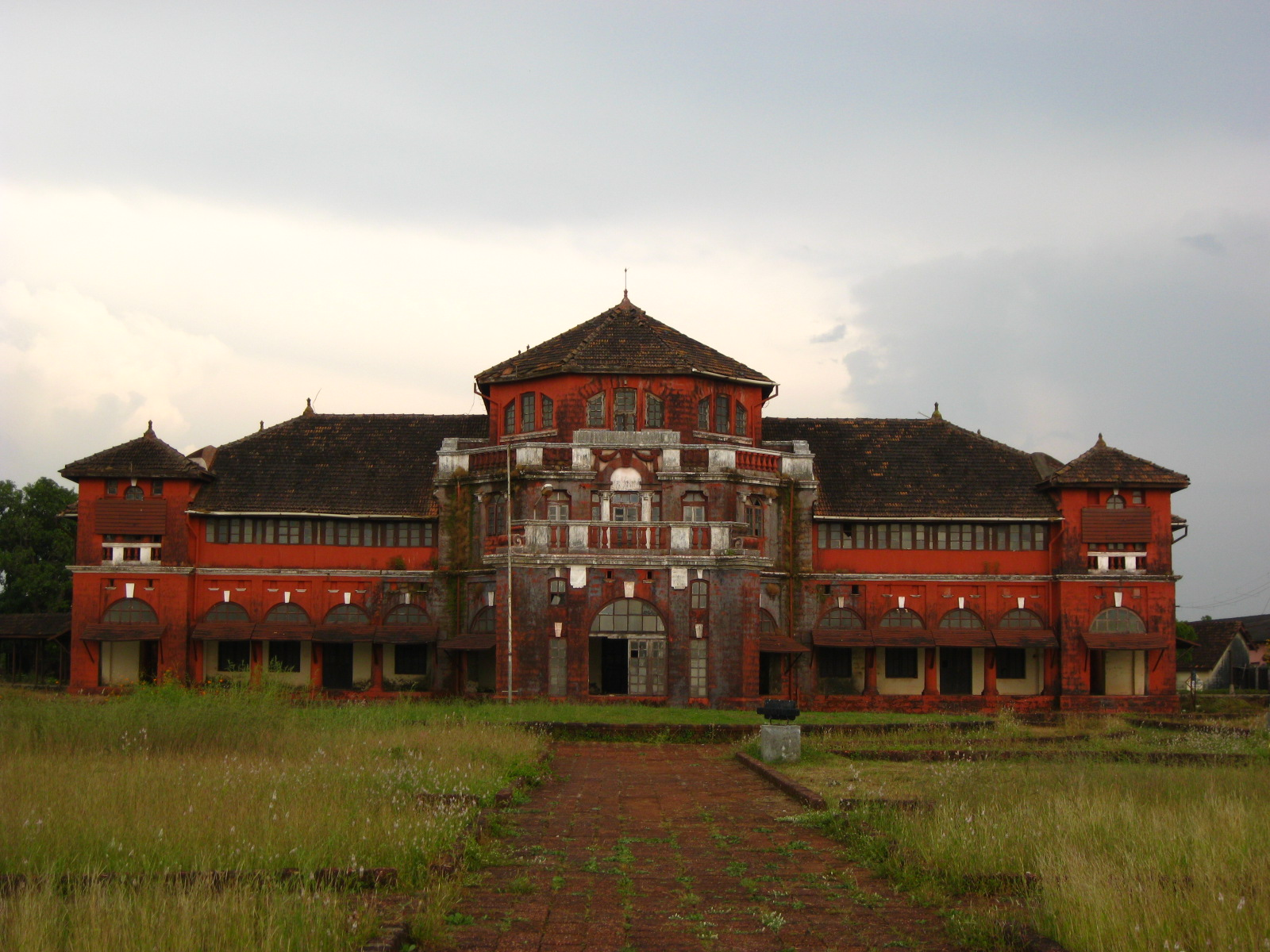
Thibaw and his family's brick residence, known as Thibaw's Palace, when in exile in Ratnagiri, India

In 1878, Thibaw succeeded his father in a bloody succession massacre. Hsinbyumashin, one of Mindon's queens, had grown dominant at the Mandalay court during Mindon's final days. Under the guise that Mindon wanted to bid his children (other princes and princesses) farewell, Hsinbyumashin had all royals of close age (who could potentially be heirs to the throne) mercilessly slaughtered by edict, to ensure that Thibaw and her daughter Supayagyi would assume the throne. During the royal Aggamahesi coronation, Supayalat pushed in next to her sister to be anointed queen at the same time, breaking an ancient royal custom. This resulted in two queens being anointed in parallel, a situation that had never occurred before in the history of Burma.

At the time of his accession, Lower Burma, half of the kingdom's former territory, had been under British occupation for thirty years and it was no secret that the King intended to regain this territory. Relations had soured during the early 1880s when the King was perceived as having made moves to more closely align his country with the French. Relations deteriorated further in an incident later called "The Great Shoe Question", where visiting British dignitaries refused to remove their shoes before entering the royal palace and were subsequently banished.

At the time, the kingdom's treasury reserves had diminished, forcing the government to increase taxation on the peasants. In 1878, the national lottery was also introduced on a trial basis, which became popular but soon went awry, with many families losing their livelihoods. The lottery experiment was ended in 1880.

In October to November 1878, a meeting at Mandalay Palace's North Garden significantly expanded the size of the Hluttaw or the royal cabinet from four departments to 14:

1. Agriculture
2. Public works
3. Land warfare
4. Taxation
5. Religious knowledge
6. Royal estate management
7. Sassamedha (Personal taxes)
8. Criminal justice
9. Civil justice
10. Water-borne warfare
11. Foreign affairs
12. Partnerships
13. Town and village affairs
14. Mechanised industries

During King Thibaw's reign, a new administrative unit, the district (ခရိုင်, khayaing), based on the administrative units of British India, was created, in order to centralize administration from the court. Altogether, the kingdom was divided into 10 districts and administrated by district ministers (ခရိုင်ဝန်), who had authority over smaller administrative units, the villages and towns. Thibaw also rolled back the conversion of local administrators from myo-thugyi (မြို့သူကြီး) to myo-ok (မြို့အုတ်), which had been part of administrative reforms carried out by Mindon, based on the prevailing administrative system in Lower Burma.

A proclamation issued by the court of King Thibaw in 1885 which called on his countrymen to conquer Lower Burma was used by the British as pretext that he was a tyrant who reneged on his treaties and they decided to complete the conquest they had started in 1824. The invasion force which consisted of 11,000 men, a fleet of flat-bottomed boats and elephant batteries, was led by General Harry Prendergast.

== Abdication ==
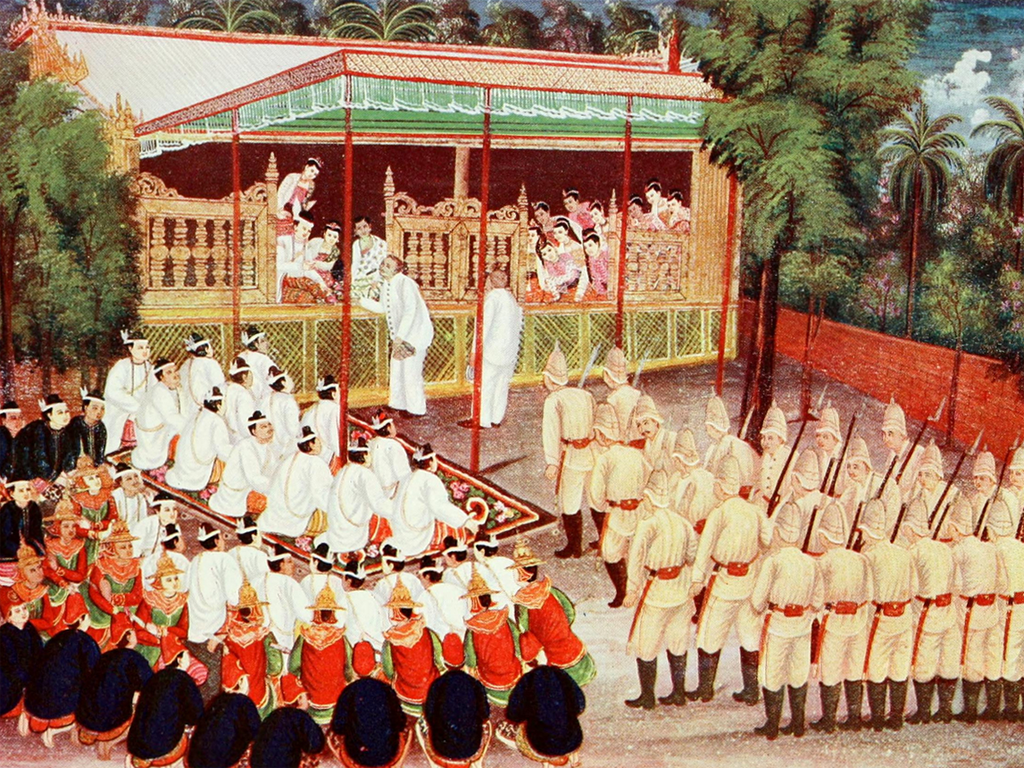
A painting by court painter Saya Chone depicting the abdication of King Thibaw.

British troops quickly reached the royal capital of Mandalay with little opposition. Within twenty-four hours, the troops had marched to the Mandalay Palace to demand the unconditional surrender of Thibaw and his kingdom within twenty-four hours. At the time, the king and queen had retired to a summer house in the palace gardens.

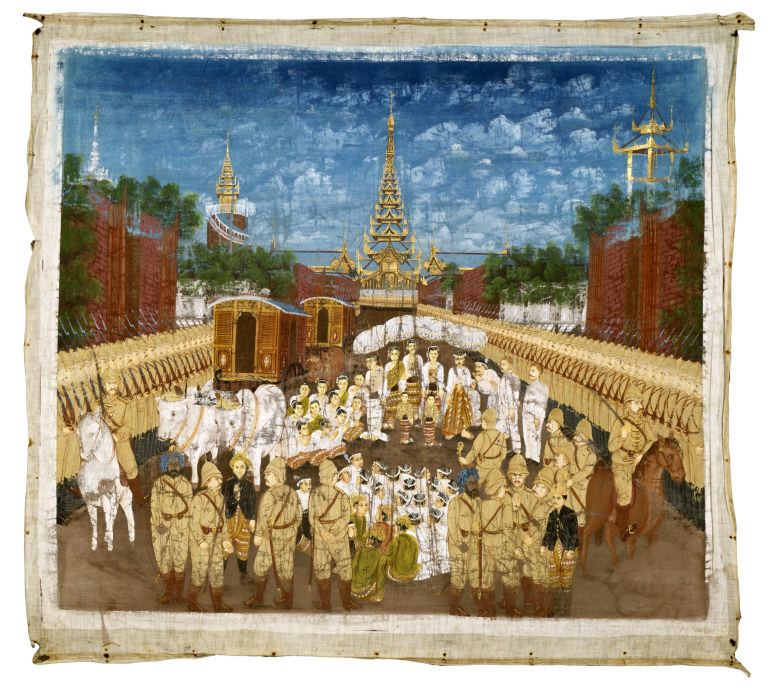
A tapestry of Thibaw and the royal family leaving Mandalay.

The following morning, King Thibaw was forced on a bullock cart, along with his family, and taken to a steamer on the Irrawaddy River, in the presence of a huge crowd of subjects.

== Life in exile ==
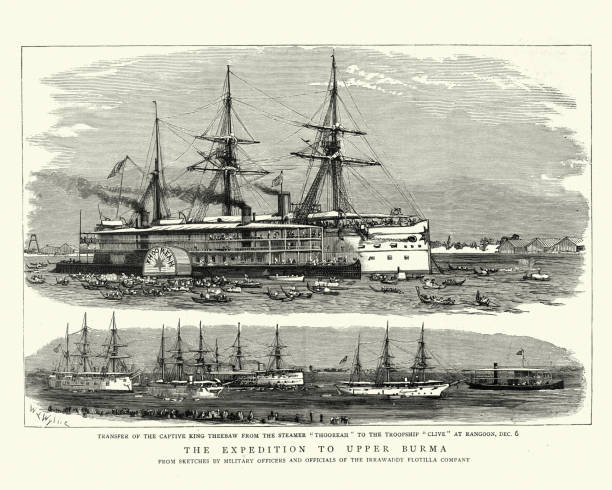
Transfer of the Captive King Theebaw from the Steamer 'Thooreah' to the Troopship 'Clive' at Rangoon, 6 December 1885.

After abdicating the throne, Thibaw, his wife Supayalat and two infant daughters were coerced by British authority to move to Ratnagiri, British India, a port city off the Arabian Sea. During their first 24 years in India, Thibaw's family lived at Outram Hall, in Dharangaon, inland from Ratanagiri, but in 1906 the Government agreed to spend over 125,000 rupees (c. £9000) to construct a new official residence for them. The family then moved into a grand two-story brick building, colloquially "Thibaw's Palace," built of laterite and lava rock, set in 20 acres (8.1 ha) of gardens.

The Government of India initially gave Thibaw an annual allowance varying between 35,000 and 42,000 rupees. This was increased in 1906 to 100,000 rupees (c. £7000). Thibaw was reported to be reclusive and did not leave the property during his time in Ratanagiri, but he sponsored local festivals, particularly during Diwali. He died at age 57 on 15 December 1916 and was buried in a small walled plot adjacent to a Christian cemetery, along with one of his consorts, Hteiksu Phaya Galay.

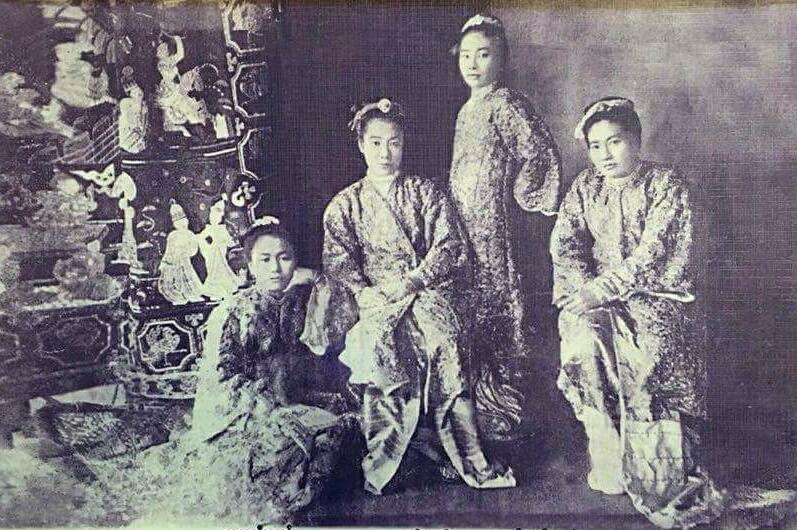
The four daughters of King Thibaw, Myat Phaya Galay, Myat Phaya Gyi, Myat Phaya Lat, Myat Phaya

== Return of royal family to Burma ==
The surviving exiled royal family was relocated to Burma in 1919, after the king's death. In exile, the king's first born daughter, Myat Phaya Gyi, had had a romance with a married Indian gatekeeper, Gopal Sawant, which resulted in a daughter, Tutu. Despite the royal family's opposition, the three returned to Ratnagiri and spent the rest of their lives there. Gyi and Tutu lived in poverty and survived by making paper flowers to sell on the markets, as Sawant took all of her pension from the British government; he did however buy them a house. Tutu also lived her life in poverty and had eleven children who knew little about their royal ancestry until 21st century interest in the royal family.

The second daughter, Myat Phaya Lat, became the pretender to the throne and married her father's private secretary, Khin Maung Lat, who was also his nephew. They did not have any children, but Lat adopted her Nepalese maidservant's son.

The third daughter, Myat Phaya, went on to marry twice. Her first marriage was to a Burmese prince, Hteik Tin Kodawgyi, with whom she had a daughter, Phaya Rita. After a divorce, she married secondly a Burmese lawyer, Mya U. Phaya Rita married her cousin, Taw Phaya, a younger son of Myat Phaya Galay.

The fourth daughter, Myat Phaya Galay (1887–1936), married a former Burmese monk, Ko Ko Naing, and had six children, the eldest of whom, Taw Phaya Gyi (1922–1948), became pretender to the throne. His son Soe Win is the present pretender. Another son, Taw Phaya, married his cousin, Phaya Rita, daughter of Myat Phaya.

Both the third and fourth daughters were born in India but died in Burma and two of their children married each other, pretender to the throne Taw Phaya and princess Phaya Rita. They had seven children, thus securing the royal family line.

== Affair with Daing Khin Khin ==
King Thibaw had a secret love affair with the noblewoman Daing Khin Khin, in the absence of his queen, Supayalat, orchestrated by his close companion, Maung Maung Toke. To marry her, King Thibaw made a solemn promise to ensure her safety within the palace and grant her the royal title of the Queen of the Northern Palace. He swore that if he were to break this promise, he would forfeit his throne, potentially leading to the downfall of the dynasty. Unfortunately, the king never fulfilled his promise, and Daing Khin Khin was executed by Supayalat while she was pregnant.

== Renewed interest ==
In December 2012, the president of Burma Thein Sein paid homage at the tomb of the king in Ratnagiri and met the late monarch's descendants. He was the first head of Burmese government to visit the grave. He also visited "Thibaw's Palace" at Ratnagiri.

== Family ==
- Parents:
  - Mindon Min
  - Laungshe Mibaya
- Consorts and children:
1. Supayalat
  1. Myat Phaya Gyi
  2. Myat Phaya Lat
  3. Myat Phaya
  4. Myat Phaya Galay
  5. 2 sons (unnamed)
2. Supayagyi
3. Supayalay (junior queen)

== Bibliography ==
- Candier, Aurore (December 2011). "Conjuncture and Reform in the Late Konbaung Period". Journal of Burma Studies 15 (2).
- Charney, Michael W. (2006). Powerful Learning: Buddhist Literati and the Throne in Burma's Last Dynasty, 1752–1885. Ann Arbor: University of Michigan.
- Desai, W. S. Deposed King Thibaw of Burma in India 1885-1916 (1967
- Hall, D.G.E. (1960). Burma (3rd ed.). Hutchinson University Library. ISBN 978-1406735031.
- Htin Aung, Maung (1967). A History of Burma. New York and London: Cambridge University Press.
- Maung Maung Tin, U (1905). Konbaung Set Yazawin (in Burmese). Vol. 1–3 (2004 ed.). Yangon: Department of Universities History Research, University of Yangon.
- Myint-U, Thant (2006). The River of Lost Footsteps—Histories of Burma. Farrar, Straus and Giroux. ISBN 978-0-374-16342-6.
- Myint-U, Thant (2001). The Making of Modern Burma. Cambridge University Press. pp. 9780521799140.
- Scott, J. George, ed. (1901). Gazetteer of Upper Burma and the Shan States. 1. Rangoon: Government of Burma.
- Shah, Sudha. The King in Exile: The Fall of the Royal Family of Burma (2012)
- Phayre, Lt. Gen. Sir Arthur P. (1883). History of Burma (1967 ed.). London: Susil Gupta.

== Links ==
Thibaw Min Konbaung dynasty Born: 1 January 1859 Died: 19 December 1916
Regnal titles
Preceded by Mindon	King of Burma; 1 October 1878 – 29 November 1885	Succeeded by Burmese monarchy abolished
Royal titles
Preceded by Kanaung	Heir to the Burmese Throne as Prince of Thibaw; 19 September 1878 – 1 October 1878	Succeeded by Myat Phaya (Presumed)
