= Ratnagiri =

City in Maharashtra, India

- City
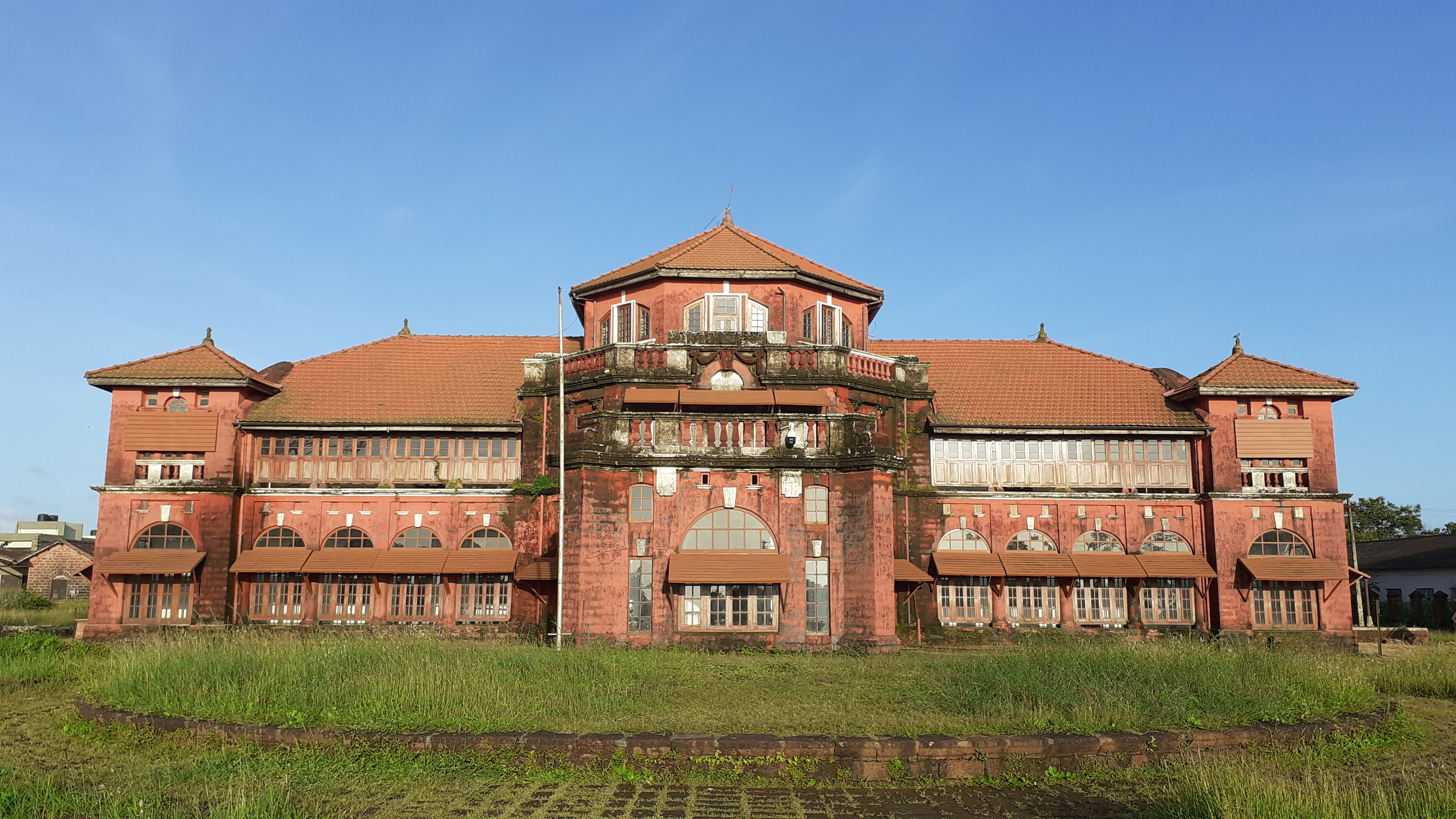
- Thibaw Palace
- Location in Maharashtra
- Coordinates: 16°59′40″N 73°18′00″E
- Country: India
- State: Maharashtra
- Region: Konkan Division
- District: Ratnagiri

Government
  - Type: Municipal council
  - Body: Ratnagiri Municipal Council
  - Rank: City
- Elevation: 11 m (36 ft)

Population (2018)
  - Total: 327,120
- Demonym(s): Ratnagirikar, Ratnakar, Girikar

Languages
  - Official: Marathi
- Time zone: UTC+5:30 (IST)
- PIN: 415612, 415639
- Telephone code: 02352
- ISO 3166 code: IN-MH
- Vehicle registration: MH-08
- Website: www.ratnagiri.nic.in

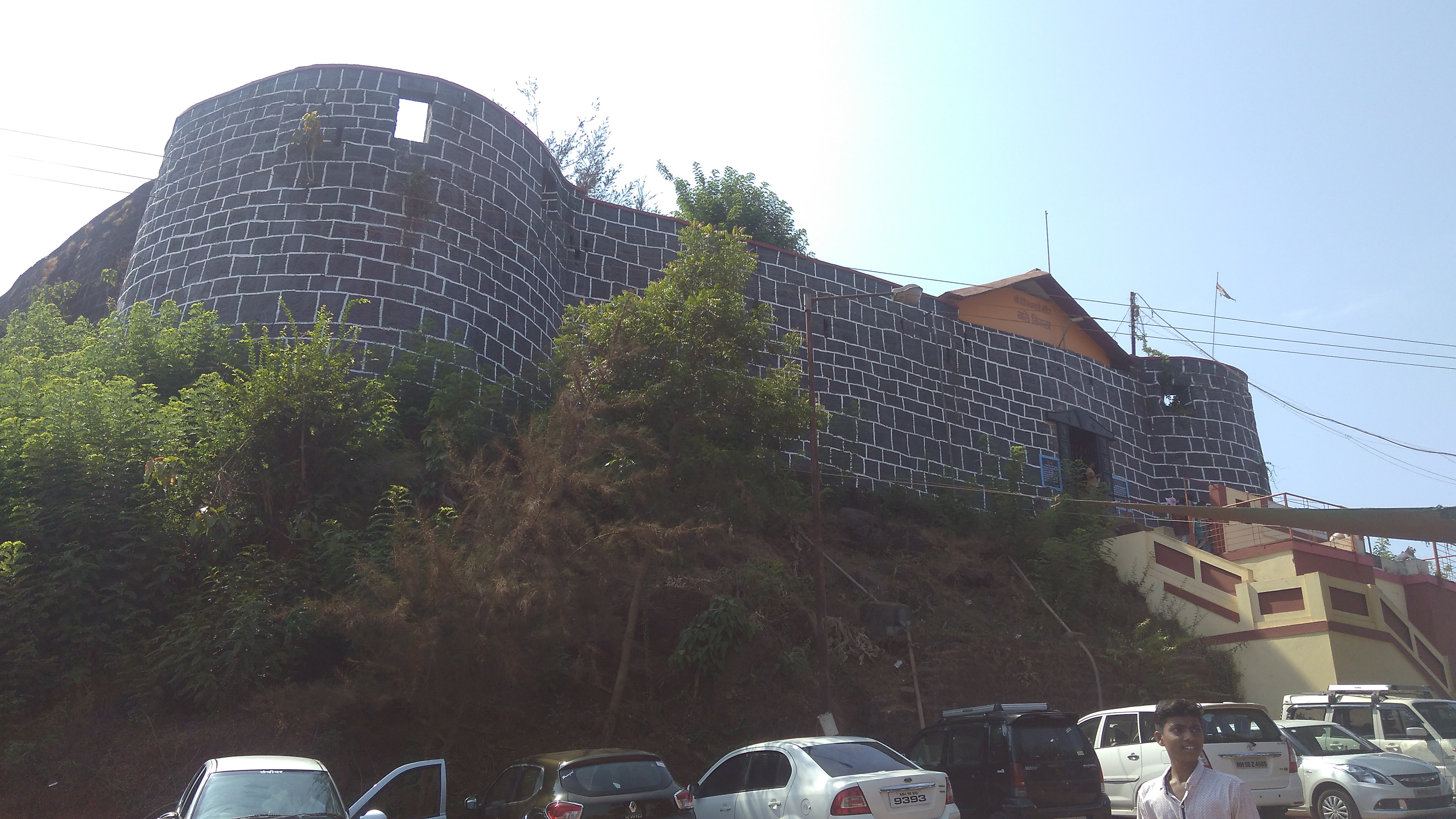
Bhagwati temple

Ratnagiri (IAST:Ratnāgirī; [ɾət̪n̪aːɡiɾiː]) is a port city on the Arabian Sea in Ratnagiri District in southwestern Maharashtra, India. The district is part of the Konkan division of Maharashtra. Known for the Hapus or Alphonso mangoes, it is sometimes colloquially referred to as the "Mango City".

Ratnagiri is the birthplace of Indian independence activist Lokmanya Tilak. Thibaw, the last king of Burma, alongside his consort Supayalat and two infant daughters, was exiled to a two-story brick mansion in Ratnagiri in the late 19th century. The building is now known as Thibaw Palace.

== History ==
Archaeological evidence suggests the area around Ratnagiri has been settled for at least 12,000 years. It served as the administrative capital under the Sultanate of Bijapur, with its strategic location making it an important military and trade center. The Ratnadurg Fort, originally built by the Bijapur Sultanate, was reconstructed by Maratha king Chhatrapati Shivaji Maharaj in 1670, who turned it into a key coastal defense post.

In 1731, Ratnagiri came under the control of the Kingdom of Satara, marking the beginning of its integration into the Maratha Empire. Following the Third Anglo-Maratha War, the British annexed Ratnagiri to British India in 1818, further embedding it into the colonial structure.

Ratnagiri holds significant cultural importance as the birthplace of Indian freedom fighter Lokmanya Bal Gangadhar Tilak, born on 23 July 1856. Tilak, an influential leader in India’s struggle for independence from the British, moved to Pune with his family at the age of 10. His early years in Ratnagiri influenced his later revolutionary thoughts.

The city was also a place of exile for King Thibaw of Burma after the British Empire annexed his country. In 1886, King Thibaw, along with his family, was exiled to Ratnagiri, where he lived the rest of his life under British surveillance. His residence, the Thibaw Palace, still stands as a symbol of this chapter in the city’s history.

Furthermore, Vinayak Damodar Savarkar was confined in Ratnagiri from 1921 to 1935, first in prison and then under local confinement. His time in Ratnagiri played a pivotal role in shaping his revolutionary ideologies.

Today, Ratnagiri is known not only for its historical significance but also for its agricultural contributions, especially the famous Alphonso mangoes, and its growing role as a cultural and educational hub in Maharashtra.

== Geography ==
Ratnagiri is located at 16.98°N 73.3°E. It has an average elevation of 11 meters (36 feet). The Sahyadri mountains border Ratnagiri to the east.

=== Climate ===
The climate is a tropical monsoon climate (Koppen: Am), with the monsoon providing heavy rain between June and October, with the rest of the year warm and dry, devoid of any rainfall.

Climate data for Ratnagiri (1991–2020, extremes 1901–present)
Month	Jan	Feb	Mar	Apr	May	Jun	Jul	Aug	Sep	Oct	Nov	Dec	Year
Record high °C (°F)	37.3 (99.1)	39.4 (102.9)	40.6 (105.1)	37.5 (99.5)	37.8 (100.0)	39.0 (102.2)	32.8 (91.0)	34.2 (93.6)	36.1 (97.0)	37.5 (99.5)	38.1 (100.6)	37.2 (99.0)	40.6 (105.1)
Mean daily maximum °C (°F)	32.0 (89.6)	32.0 (89.6)	32.3 (90.1)	32.6 (90.7)	33.3 (91.9)	30.8 (87.4)	29.0 (84.2)	28.9 (84.0)	29.7 (85.5)	32.4 (90.3)	34.0 (93.2)	33.0 (91.4)	31.6 (88.9)
Daily mean °C (°F)	25.0 (77.0)	25.5 (77.9)	26.9 (80.4)	28.5 (83.3)	29.5 (85.1)	27.6 (81.7)	26.6 (79.9)	26.5 (79.7)	26.5 (79.7)	27.7 (81.9)	27.5 (81.5)	26.1 (79.0)	27.0 (80.6)
Mean daily minimum °C (°F)	18.4 (65.1)	19.1 (66.4)	21.6 (70.9)	24.3 (75.7)	26.0 (78.8)	24.8 (76.6)	24.3 (75.7)	24.1 (75.4)	23.7 (74.7)	23.4 (74.1)	21.9 (71.4)	19.8 (67.6)	22.7 (72.9)
Record low °C (°F)	11.5 (52.7)	11.6 (52.9)	14.4 (57.9)	16.1 (61.0)	20.8 (69.4)	19.2 (66.6)	18.4 (65.1)	20.6 (69.1)	20.4 (68.7)	17.7 (63.9)	15.4 (59.7)	13.9 (57.0)	11.5 (52.7)
Average rainfall mm (inches)	0.3 (0.01)	0.0 (0.0)	0.2 (0.01)	1.4 (0.06)	38.3 (1.51)	901.8 (35.50)	1,041.7 (41.01)	678.1 (26.70)	416.4 (16.39)	149.4 (5.88)	15.1 (0.59)	2.1 (0.08)	3,245 (127.76)
Average rainy days	0.1	0.0	0.0	0.2	2.2	20.0	26.2	24.7	15.1	6.4	1.0	0.2	96.1
Average relative humidity (%) (at 17:30 IST)	54	56	62	66	67	81	86	85	81	73	61	55	69
Source 1: India Meteorological Department
Source 2: Tokyo Climate Center (mean temperatures 1991–2020)

== Government and politics ==
The Ratnagiri Municipality was established in 1876. The Office of the President of the Council was occupied by Mr. Pradeep Salvi of the Shivsena, before it got dismissed due to the completion of the Term. Currently, the Office of the Council President remains vacant with the Administrator and the Chief Officer being in charge of the Municipal Administration.

Ratnagiri (Vidhan Sabha constituency):

Uday Samant (Shiv Sena), The Incumbent Cabinet Minister of Industries Uday Samant Government of Maharashtra represents the Ratnagiri constituency in State Assembly since 2004, and has been appointed as the Guardian Minister of the Ratnagiri.

Ratnagiri–Sindhudurg (Lok Sabha constituency):

Narayan Rane (BJP) represents the Ratnagiri-Sindhudurg constituency in Lok Sabha, lower house of the parliament since 2024.

== Transport ==
=== Road ===
Ratnagiri is well connected to the other parts of the state and country by National Highways & State Highways. National Highways NH 66 (Panvel – Edapally), NH 166 (Ratnagiri – Nagpur) and Coastal Highway (Rewas – Reddy) pass through the city. MSRTC operates bus services to Mumbai, Thane, Vasai, Nala Sopara, Kalyan, Bhiwandi, Pune, Panaji, Nanded, Latur, Tuljapur, Akkalkot, Ambajogai, Beed, Kolhapur, Gargoti, Gadhinglaj, Nrushimhawadi, Ichalkaranji, Sangli, Miraj, Tasgaon, Jat, Islampur, Satara, Belgaum, Hubli, Bijapur and other major towns of the state. North Western Karnataka Road Transport Corporation also operates buses from Belgaum, Bijapur, Gulbarga, Indi, Muddebihal, Sindgi, Athani, Jevargi and Talikota. Several private buses regularly ply for Mumbai and Pune and a few for Kolhapur, Bijapur.

=== Railways ===
Ratnagiri is a major Railhead on Konkan Railway route. Ratnagiri is also one of the two divisions of Konkan Railway Corporation. The city is well connected to Mumbai, New Delhi, Amritsar, Chandigarh, Dehradun, Jaipur, Jodhpur, Bikaner, Ahmedabad, Vadodara, Surat, Bhuj, Indore, Jabalpur, Patna, Nagpur, Pune, Margao, Mangalore, Kochi, Thiruvananthapuram, Kanyakumari, Coimbatore and other major towns of the country. Every train passing through the city halts here. Connectivity to western Maharashtra is proposed through Vaibhavwadi Road – Kolhapur route.

== See also ==
- Chiplun
