= Martin Corcoran =

Irish hurler

Personal information
- Native name: Máirtín Ó Corcáin (Irish)
- Born: 1982 (age 43–44) Coolderry, County Offaly, Ireland

Sport
- Sport: Hurling
- Position: Midfield
Club
- Years: Club
- Coolderry
Club titles
- Offaly titles: 5
- Leinster titles: 1
- All-Ireland Titles: 0
Inter-county*
Years	County	Apps (scores)
2005	Offaly	1 (0-00)
Inter-county titles
- Leinster titles: 0
- All-Irelands: 0
- NHL: 0
- All Stars: 0
- *Inter County team apps and scores correct as of 16:49, 8 April 2026.

Martin Corcoran (born 1982) is an Irish hurler. At club level, he plays with Coolderry and at inter-county level is a former member of the Offaly senior hurling team.

== Career ==
At club level, Corcoran first played hurling for Coolderry at juvenile and underage levels. He progressed to adult level and won his first Offaly SHC medal in 2004, following a 3–10 to 2–11 win over Birr in the final. Corcoran won back-to-back Offaly SHC medals in 2010 and 2011. He later claimed a Leinster Club SHC title and lined out at wing-back in Coolderry's defeat by Loughgiel Shamrocks in the 2012 All-Ireland club final. Corcoran won further Offaly SHC titles in 2015 and 2018.

Corcoran first appeared on the inter-county scene for Offaly as a member of the minor team in 2000 and won a Leinster MHC medal that year. He later had a brief stint with the under-21 team. Corcoran made his senior team debut in a National Hurling League game against Derry in February 2005. He won a Division 2 medal that year, in what was his only season with the team.

== Honours ==
Coolderry

- Leinster Senior Club Hurling Championship (1): 2011
- Offaly Senior Hurling Championship (5): 2004, 2010, 2011, 2015, 2018

Offaly

- National Hurling League Division 2 (1): 2005
- Leinster Minor Hurling Championship (1): 2000
