= Trevor Corcoran =

Irish hurler

Personal information
- Native name: Treamhair Ó Corcáin (Irish)
- Born: 1985 (age 40–41) Coolderry, County Offaly, Ireland

Sport
- Sport: Hurling
- Position: Right corner-back
Club
- Years: Club
- Coolderry
Club titles
- Offaly titles: 5
- Leinster titles: 1
- All-Ireland Titles: 0
Inter-county*
Years	County	Apps (scores)
2007-2008	Offaly	1 (0-00)
Inter-county titles
- Leinster titles: 0
- All-Irelands: 0
- NHL: 0
- All Stars: 0
- *Inter County team apps and scores correct as of 16:41, 8 April 2026.

Trevor Corcoran (born 1985) is an Irish hurler. At club level, he plays with Coolderry and at inter-county level is a former member of the Offaly senior hurling team.

== Career ==
At club level, Corcoran first played hurling for Coolderry at juvenile and underage levels. He progressed to adult level and won his first Offaly SHC medal in 2004, following a 3–10 to 2–11 win over Birr in the final. Corcoran won back-to-back Offaly SHC medals in 2010 and 2011. He later claimed a Leinster Club SHC title and lined out at wing-back in Coolderry's defeat by Loughgiel Shamrocks in the 2012 All-Ireland club final. Corcoran ended his club career after winning further Offaly SHC titles in 2015 and 2018.

Corcoran first appeared on the inter-county scene for Offaly as a member of the under-21 team in 2006. He made his senior team debut in a National Hurling League game against Wexford in March 2007. Corcoran spent two years with the team.

== Honours ==
Coolderry

- Leinster Senior Club Hurling Championship (1): 2011
- Offaly Senior Hurling Championship (5): 2004, 2010, 2011, 2015, 2018
