= Kevin Brady (hurler) =

Irish hurler

Personal information
- Native name: Caoimhín Ó Brádaigh (Irish)
- Born: 1983 (age 42–43) Coolderry, County Offaly, Ireland

Sport
- Sport: Hurling
- Position: Right wing-back
Club
- Years: Club
- Coolderry
Club titles
- Offaly titles: 5
- Leinster titles: 1
- All-Ireland Titles: 0
Inter-county*
Years	County	Apps (scores)
2003-2014	Offaly	37 (1-09)
Inter-county titles
- Leinster titles: 0
- All-Irelands: 0
- NHL: 0
- All Stars: 0
- *Inter County team apps and scores correct as of 16:09, 8 April 2026.

Kevin Brady (born 1983) is an Irish former hurler. At club level, he played with Coolderry and at inter-county level with the Offaly senior hurling team.

== Career ==
At club level, Brady first played hurling for Coolderry at juvenile and underage levels. He progressed to adult level and won his first Offaly SHC medal in 2004, following a 3–10 to 2–11 win over Birr in the final. Brady won back-to-back Offaly SHC medals in 2010 and 2011. He later claimed a Leinster Club SHC title and lined out at wing-back in Coolderry's defeat by Loughgiel Shamrocks in the 2012 All-Ireland club final. Brady ended his club career after winning further Offaly SHC titles in 2015 and 2018.

Brady first appeared on the inter-county scene for Offaly as a member of the minor team in 2011. He later spent three consecutive years with the under-21 team. Brady made his senior team debut in a National Hurling League game against Tipperary in February 2003. He was a mainstay of the team for over a decade, including one season as team captain, and often lined out with his brother, Joe. Brady won Division 2 medals in 2005 and 2009. He retired from inter-county hurling in November 2014.

== Honours ==
Coolderry

- Leinster Senior Club Hurling Championship (1): 2011
- Offaly Senior Hurling Championship (5): 2004, 2010, 2011, 2015, 2018

Offaly

- National Hurling League Division 2 (2): 2005, 2009

Sporting positions
Preceded by Rory Hanniffy	Offaly senior hurling team captain 2008	Succeeded by Ger Oakley
