= 2008 All-Ireland Senior Hurling Championship =

Championship details
- Dates: 25 May – 7 September 2008
- Teams: 12

All-Ireland champions
- Winning team: Kilkenny (31st win)
- Captain: James 'Cha' Fitzpatrick
- Manager: Brian Cody

All-Ireland Finalists
- Losing team: Waterford
- Captain: Michael 'Brick' Walsh
- Manager: Davy FitzGerald

Provincial champions
- Munster: Tipperary
- Leinster: Kilkenny
- Ulster: Antrim
- Connacht: Not Played

Championship statistics
- No. matches played: 24
- Goals total: 79 (3.29 per game)
- Points total: 846 (35.25 per game)
- Top Scorer: Eoin Kelly (7–43)
- Player of the Year: Eoin Larkin
- All-Star Team: See here

The All-Ireland Senior Hurling Championship 2008 was the 122nd since its establishment by the Gaelic Athletic Association in 1887. The first matches of the season were played on 25 May 2008, and the championship ended on 7 September 2008. Kilkenny went into the 2008 championship as defending champions, having won their thirtieth All-Ireland title the previous year.

The championship culminated with the All-Ireland final, held at Croke Park, Dublin. The match was contested by Kilkenny and Waterford. It was their first meeting in the final since 1963. Kilkenny won the game by 3–30 to 1–13. It was their third All-Ireland title in succession and a record thirty-first for the county. Kilkenny overtook Cork with the most All Ireland Titles. A position which they have not lost since.

== Format ==
The format of the 2008 championship was slightly different from previous formats:

12 counties participated in Tier 1 of the 2008 Championship. These teams were as follows:

- Leinster: Dublin, Kilkenny, Laois, Offaly, Wexford
- Munster: Clare, Cork, Limerick, Tipperary, Waterford
- Connacht: Galway (Connacht representative)
- Ulster: Antrim (Ulster champions)

Provincial Championships

The Leinster and Munster championships were played as usual. The Leinster and Munster champions advanced directly to the All-Ireland semi-finals. The Ulster champions advanced to the qualifiers. The Connacht championship was not played. Galway entered the qualifiers as Connacht representatives.

All-Ireland Qualifiers

Phase 1: (1 match) This was a single match between Antrim and Galway.

Phase 2: (2 matches) The winner of the phase 1 game played the team eliminated in the first round of the Leinster Championship. The loser of the phase 1 game played the team eliminated in the first round of the Munster Championship.

Phase 3: (2 matches) This phase consisted of two knock-out games between the beaten provincial semi-finalists in Leinster and Munster. Teams from the same province could not meet in these games.

Phase 4: (2 matches) The winners from phase 2 played the winners from phase 3 in a knock-out format.

All-Ireland Series

Quarter-finals: (2 matches) The defeated Munster and Leinster finalists played the winners of the qualifier phase 4 games.

Semi-finals: (2 matches) The Munster and Leinster champions played the winners of the quarter-finals.

Promotion/relegation

The losing teams from the qualifier phase 2 games played off. The loser of this game played a promotion/relegation play-off against the winners of the Christy Ring Cup.

== Teams ==
=== General information ===
Thirteen counties will compete in the All-Ireland Senior Hurling Championship: one team in the Connacht Senior Hurling Championship, six teams in the Leinster Senior Hurling Championship, five teams in the Munster Senior Hurling Championship and one team in the Ulster Senior Hurling Championship.

County	Last provincial title	Last championship title	Position in 2007 Championship	Appearance
Antrim	2007	—	Qualifier Group A	
Clare	1998	1997	Quarter-finals	
Cork	2006	2005	Quarter-finals	
Dublin	1961	1938	Qualifier Group B	
Galway	1999	1988	Quarter-finals	
Kilkenny	2007	2007	Champions	
Laois	1949	1915	Qualifier Group A	
Limerick	1996	1973	Runners-up	
Offaly	1995	1998	Qualifier Group B	
Tipperary	2001	2001	Quarter-finals	
Waterford	2007	1959	Semi-finals	
Westmeath	—	—	Champions (Christy Ring Cup)	
Wexford	2004	1996	Semi-finals	

=== Personal and kits ===
Team	Colours	Sponsor	Captain(s)	Manager(s)					
Team	Colours	Sponsor	Captain(s)	Manager(s)	Antrim	Saffron and white	Creagh Concrete	Paddy Richmond	Terence 'Sambo' McNaughton; Dominic McKinley
Clare	Saffron and blue	Vodafone	Brian O'Connell	Mike McNamara					
Cork	Red and white	O2	John Gardiner	Gerald McCarthy					
Dublin	Navy and blue	Arnotts	Stephen Hiney	Tommy Naughton					
Galway	Maroon and white	Supermacs	Ollie Canning	Ger Loughnane					
Kilkenny	Black and amber	Glanbia	James 'Cha' Fitzpatrick	Brian Cody					
Laois	Blue and white	The Heritage Hotel		Damien Fox; Niall Rigney					
Limerick	Green and white	Sporting Limerick	Mark Foley	Richie Bennis					
Offaly	Green, white and gold	Carroll Cuisine	Kevin Brady	Joe Dooley					
Tipperary	Blue and gold	Enfer	Eoin Kelly; Paul Ormonde	Liam Sheedy					
Waterford	White and blue	3	Michael 'Brick' Walsh	Davy FitzGerald					
Wexford	Purple and yellow	Wexford Cheddar	Rory Jacob	John Meyler					

== Leinster Senior Hurling Championship ==
Quarter-Finals
Dublin	3–21
Westmeath	0–11
Laois	2–12
Offaly	4–22

Semi-Finals
Dublin	0–19, 1–15
Wexford	2–13, 2–15
Offaly	0–12
Kilkenny	2–24

Final
Wexford	0–17
Kilkenny	5–21

May 25
1st Round

Laois	2–12 – 4–22	Offaly
W Hyland 2–3 (2-0f), N Costello 0–9 (7f).		B Carroll 0–16 (11f, 1 '65'), D Hayden 1–1, G Healion, D Molloy, J Rigney 1–0 each, S Dooley 0–2, A Egan, B Murphy, P Cleary 0–1 each.

O'Moore Park, Portlaoise
Referee: C McAllister (Cork)

May 25
1st Round

Dublin	3–21 – 0–11	Westmeath
D O'Callaghan 1–6 (1f), J Kelly, J Burke 1–1 each, R Fallon 0–3 (2f, 1 '65'), S Lambert, K Flynn, R O'Carroll 0–2 each, P Carton, D Curtin, M Carton, J McCaffrey 0–1 each.		A Mitchell 0–4 (4f), B Murtagh 0–3, P Clarke, D McNicholas 0–2 each.

O'Moore Park, Portlaoise
Referee: C McAllister (Cork)

June 14
Semi-final

Dublin	0–19 – 2–13	Wexford
D O'Callaghan 0–9 (3f), R O'Carroll 0–4, M Carton, J McCaffery (sl), S Lambert, J Burke, D O'Dwyer, K Flynn 0–1 each.		E Quigley 1–2, D Lyng 0–5 (4f), S Banville 1–0, R Jacob 0–3, S Doyle 0–2, D Redmond 0–1.

Nowlan Park, Kilkenny
Referee: S Roche (Tipperary)

June 15
Semi-final

Offaly	0–12 – 2–24	Kilkenny
B Carroll 0–6 (2f, 1’65’), G Healion, J Bergin 0–2 each, R Hanniffy, D Molloy 0–1 each.		H Shefflin 0–11 (9f, 1’65’), E Larkin 0–4, M Comerford 1–1, A Fogarty 1–0, M Rice, E Brennan 0–2 each, J Fitzpatrick, M Fennelly, R Hogan, TJ Reid 0–1 each.

O'Moore Park, Portlaoise
Referee: J Sexton (Cork)

June 22
Semi-final
Replay

Dublin	1–15 – 2–15	Wexford
D O'Callaghan 1–9, R Fallon, J McCaffrey 0–2 each, M Carton, K Flynn 0–1 each.		R Jacob 1–2, S Banville 1–1, D Lyng 0–4, S Doyle 0–3, W Doran 0–2, D Redmond, PJ Nolan, E Quigley 0–1 each.

Croke Park, Dublin
Referee: M Wadding (Waterford)

July 6
Final

Kilkenny	5–21 – 0–17	Wexford
H Shefflin 1–7 (1-7f), E Brennan 2–2, R Power 1–2, A Fogarty 1–1, J Fitzpatrick 0–4 (1f), E Larkin 0–3, D Lyng, M Comerford 0–1 each.	Report	D Lyng 0–7 (6f, 1 sl), R Jacob 0–3, PJ Nolan, D Redmond 0–2 each, S Doyle, M Jacob, B Lambert 0–1 each.

Croke Park, Dublin
Attendance: 18,855
Referee: B Kelly (Westmeath)

== Munster Senior Hurling Championship ==
Quarter-Finals
Waterford	0–23
Clare	2–26

Semi-Finals
Cork	1–13
Tipperary	1–19
Limerick	1–16
Clare	4–12

Final
Tipperary	2–21
Clare	0–19

June 1
1st Round

Waterford	0–23 – 2–26	Clare
D Bennett 0–10 (9f), J Mullane 0–8, G Hurney, S Molumphy, S Prendergast, E McGrath, D Coffey 0–1 each.		M Flaherty 1–7 (3f, 2 '65'), N Gilligan 1–2, T Griffin 0–5, C Plunkett 0–3 (2f), D McMahon 0–3, C Lynch, T Carmody 0–2 each, P Vaughan, B Bugler 0–1 each.

Gaelic Grounds, Limerick
Referee: D Murphy (Wexford)

June 8
Semi-final

Cork	1–13 – 1–19	Tipperary
B O'Connor 1–3 (2f), C Naughton 0–4, J O'Connor 0–2, S Óg Ó hAilpín, P O'Sullivan, T Kenny, B Corry 0–1 each.		E Kelly 1–7 (5f), L Corbett 0–4, S Callanan 0–3, E Corcoran (sl), W Ryan, S McGrath, P Kerwick, M Webster 0–1 each.

Páirc Uí Chaoimh, Cork
Referee: B Kelly (Westmeath)

June 22
Semi-final

Clare	4–12 – 1–16	Limerick
J Clancy 1–2, B Nugent 1–1, P Vaughan, D McMahon 1–0 each, M Flattery (3f), N Gilligan (2f) 0–3 each, T Carmody 0–2, C Lynch 0–1.		A O’Shaughnessy 0–6 (5f), N Moran 0–5, O Moran 1–1, D Reale, D O'Grady, M O'Brien, D Ryan 0–1 each.

Semple Stadium, Thurles
Referee: E Morris (Dublin)

July 13
Final

Tipperary	2–21 – 0–19	Clare
J O'Brien 1–4, S Callanan 1–3, E Kelly 0–6 (2f), S McGrath 0–3, L Corbett 0–2, J Woodlock, P Kerwick, H Maloney 0–1 each.		N Gilligan 0–8 (5f), M Flaherty (3f), C Lynch 0–3 each, T Carmody 0–2, J Clancy, G Quinn, D McMahon 0–1 each.

Gaelic Grounds, Limerick
Attendance: 48,077
Referee: D Kirwan (Cork)

== Ulster Senior Hurling Championship ==
2nd round

Quarter-Finals

Semi-Finals

Final

Down
4–16

London
'1–16

Armagh
4–16

London
2–13

London
2–23

Tyrone
1–06

Down
2–16

Antrim

3–18

Antrim

2–17

Derry
1–12

Derry
7–23

Donegal
1–14

Monaghan
3–13

Monaghan
1–15

2008 marked the first time in decades that all nine Ulster counties (plus London) competed in the Ulster championship.

Due to the historical strength of Antrim and the relative strength of Down, and more recently Derry and Armagh, a system of seeding was used to prevent one-sided matches. The success of the format was indicated by two 'underdog' victories, for Monaghan over Donegal, and London over Armagh, and a number of close matches. However, Antrim retained the trophy beating Down in the final.

May 11
1st Round

Cavan	1–16 – 2–15	Monaghan

Breffni Park, Cavan

May 11
1st Round

Tyrone	1–11 – 2–7	Fermanagh

Brewster Park, Enniskillen

May 18
2nd Round

Donegal	1–14 – 1–15	Monaghan

St Tiernach's Park, Clones

May 18
2nd Round

London	2–13 – 1–6	Tyrone

Healy Park, Omagh

May 24
Quarter-final

Armagh	4–16 – 2–23	London

Páirc Esler, Newry

May 25
Quarter-final

Derry	7–23 – 3–13	Monaghan

Celtic Park, Derry

June 1
Semi-final

Down	4–16 – 1–16	London

Casement Park, Belfast

June 1
Semi-final

Antrim	2–17 – 1–12	Derry

Casement Park, Belfast

June 15
Final

Down	2–16 – 3–18	Antrim

Casement Park, Belfast

== All-Ireland qualifiers ==
Phase 1
Antrim	1–10
Galway	6–21

Phase 2+3
Waterford	6–18
Antrim	0–15
Limerick	0–18
Offaly	3–19
Galway	1–26
Laois	0–09
Cork	1–17
Dublin	0–15

Phase 4
Waterford	2–18
Offaly	0–18
Galway	2–15
Cork	0–23

Finals
Waterford
Cork

June 28
Phase 1

Antrim	1–10 – 6–21	Galway
D Mc Naughton 0–4 (4f), M Magill 1–0, M Herron, K Stewart, K McKeegan (1f) 0–2 each.		J Canning 2–6 (1-2f), K Wade 2–0, D Hayes 1–2, A Kerins 1–1, C Donnellan, I Tannian 0–3 each, A Cullinane, F Healy 0–2 each, E Cloonan, D Joyce 0–1 each.

Casement Park, Belfast
Referee: J Ryan (Tipperary)

July 5
Phase 2

Waterford	6–18 – 0–15	Antrim
E Kelly 2–3 (3f), J Mullane 2–2, E McGrath 0–5, D Shanahan 0–4, G Hurney, E Molumphy 1–0 each, J Nagle 0–2, P Flynn, D Bennett 0–1 each.		P Shiels 0–7 (5f), PJ O'Connell, K Stewart 0–2 each, C Herron, M Herron, B Quinn, S McNaughton 0–1 each.

Walsh Park, Waterford
Referee: M Haverty (Galway)

July 5
Phase 2

Galway	1–26 – 0–9	Laois
J Canning 0–9 (4f), A Cullinane 1–2, G Farragher (2f), D Hayes 0–4 each, A Kerins 0–3, I Tannian, A Smith 0–2 each.		N Costello (3f), J Brophy 0–3 each, J Rowney, E Holohan, W Hyland 0–1 each.

Pearse Stadium, Galway
Referee: J McGrath (Westmeath)

July 12
Phase 3

Cork	1–17 – 0–15	Dublin
J Deane 1–1, C Naughton 0–3, T Kenny, J O'Connor, B O'Connor (1f), N Ronan 0–2 each, J Gardiner (1f), E Cadogan, N McCarthy, P Cronin, P Horgan 0–1 each.		D O'Callaghan 0–10 (7f), R O'Carroll 0–3, P Ryan 0–2.

Páirc Uí Chaoimh, Cork
Referee: J Owens (Wexford)

July 12
Phase 3

Limerick	0–18 – 3–19	Offaly
P Tobin 0–5, A O'Shaughnessy 0–4 (1f), N Moran 0–3, W McNamara, B Geary (1 '65'), M Foley, D Ryan, D Sheehan, K Tobin 0–1 each.		J Bergin 3–2, S Dooley (1f), B Carroll (1f, 1 '65') 0–6 each, D Molloy 0–2, B Murphy, D Horan (1 '65'), D Currams 0–1 each.

Gaelic Grounds, Limerick
Referee: C McAllister (Cork)

July 19
Phase 4

Waterford	2–18 – 0–18	Offaly
E Kelly 2–13, J Mullane 0–2, E McGrath, S Prendergast, S Molumphy 0–1 each.		B Carroll 0–9, B Murphy, G Hannify 0–2 each; D Franks, P Cleary, S Dooley, D Molly, J Bergin 0–1 each.

Semple Stadium, Thurles
Attendance: 30,082
Referee: M Haverty (Galway)

July 19
Phase 4

Galway	2–15 – 0–23	Cork
J Canning 2–12(6f, 1 sideline, 1–0 penalty), N Healy, D Hayes, R Murray 0–1 each.	Report	B O’Connor 0–12, J Deane 0–4, C Naughton 0–3, J Gardiner 0–2, N McCarthy, P Horgan 0–1 each.

Semple Stadium, Thurles
Attendance: 30,082
Referee: B Kelly (Westmeath)

== Relegation play-offs ==
July 19
Semi-final

Antrim	2–18 – 0–16	Laois
P Shiels 0–8 (8f), S McNaughton 1-3, Paddy Richmond1.1, K Stewart 0–2, J Campbell, E McCloskey, M Herron, C Duffin 0–1 each.		N Costello 0–5 (4f), W Hyland, J Brophy (1f) 0–3 each, E Holohan, C Delaney 0–2 each, T Fitzgerald 0–1.

Páirc Tailteann, Navan
Referee: J O'Mahony (Limerick)

August 9
Final

Laois	4–18 – 3–11	Carlow
W Hyland 1–5 (1f), D Peacock, T Fitzgerald 1–2 each, N Holmes 1–1, J Brophy 0–3 (1f), J Walsh, J Phelan 0–2 each, C Delaney 0–1.		C Doyle 1–2, M Brennan 1–1, C Hughes (2f), S Kavanagh (2f, 1 '65') 0–3 each, D Murphy 1–0, R Foley, S Murphy 0–1 each.

Dr Cullen Park, Carlow
Referee: D Richardson (Limerick)

== All-Ireland Senior Hurling Championship ==
=== Bracket ===
Teams in bold advanced to the next round. The provincial champions are marked by an asterisk.

Quarter-Finals; July 27
Clare	2–17
**Cork**	**2–19**
Wexford	3–15
**Waterford**	**2–19**

Semi-Finals; August 10 / August 17
**Kilkenny***	**1–23**
Cork	0–17
Tipperary*	1–18
**Waterford**	**1–20**

Final; September 7
**Kilkenny***	**3–30**
Waterford	1–13

=== All-Ireland quarter-finals ===
July 27
Quarter-final

Wexford	3–15 – 2–19	Waterford
S Doyle 2–1, D Lyng 0–5 (5f), W Doran 1–1, R Jacob 0–3 (1f), D Redmond 0–2, S Nolan, E Quigley, D Fitzhenry (pen) 0–1 each.		E Kelly 1–8 (1-6f, 1 '65'), E McGrath 0–4, D Shanahan 1–1, J Mullane 0–3, J Nagle, S Prendergast, S Molumphy 0–1 each.

Semple Stadium, Thurles
Attendance: 46,571
Referee: J Sexton (Cork)

July 27
Quarter-final

Clare	2–17 – 2–19	Cork
N Gilligan 0–8 (3f, 1 '65'), D Mc Mahon, B Nugent 1–1 each, J Clancy, T Carmody 0–2 each, G Quinn (1f), P Donnellan, B O'Connell (sl) 0–1 each.		B O'Connor 0–7 (3f, 1 '65'), T McCarthy, K Murphy 1–0 each, P Horgan 0–3, P Cronin, N Ronan 0–2 each, T Kenny, J O'Connor, N McCarthy, C Naughton, J Deane 0–1 each.

Semple Stadium, Thurles
Attendance: 46,571
Referee: D Murphy (Wexford)

=== All-Ireland semi-finals ===
August 10
Semi-final

Kilkenny	1–23 – 0–17	Cork
H Shefflin 0–11 (6f), E Larkin 1–2, A Fogarty 0–5, TJ Reid 0–2, R Power, E Brennan, J Fitzpatrick 0–1 each.		B O'Connor 0–8 (8f), T Kenny 0–2, J Gardiner 0–1, P Horgan 0–1, J O'Connor 0–1, P Cronin 0–1, C Naughton 0–1, N Ronan 0–1, T McCarthy 0–1.

Croke Park, Dublin
Attendance: 71,235
Referee: M Wadding (Waterford)

August 17
Semi-final

Tipperary	1–18 – 1–20	Waterford
E Kelly 0–8 (6f), S Callanan 1–3, S McGrath 0–3, C O’Mahony (1f), L Corbett, P Kerwick, S Maher 0–1 each.	Report	E Kelly 1–10 (8f), J Mullane 0–3, E McGrath, S Molumphy, M Walsh 0–2 each, J Kennedy 0–1.

Croke Park, Dublin
Attendance: 53,635
Referee: D Kirwan (Cork)

=== All-Ireland final ===
September 7
Final

Kilkenny	3–30 – 1–13	Waterford
E Brennan 2–4, H Shefflin 0–8 (5f, 1 '65'), E Larkin 1–4, TJ Reid 0–4, A Fogarty, D Lyng 0–3 each, R Power, J Fitzpatrick 0–2 each.		E Kelly 1–9 (9f), J Mullane 0–3, D Bennett 0–1.

Croke Park, Dublin
Attendance: 82,186
Referee: B Kelly (Westmeath)

== Championship statistics ==
=== Scoring ===
- Top scorer from play in the championship: John Mullane for Waterford 2–21
- First goal of the championship: Brian Carroll for Offaly against Laois (Leinster quarter-final)
- Last goal of the championship: Eoin Kelly for Waterford against Kilkenny (All-Ireland final)
- First hat-trick of the championship: Joe Bergin for Offaly against Limerick (All-Ireland qualifier)
- Widest winning margin: 26 points
  - Waterford 6–21 : 1–10 Antrim (All-Ireland qualifier)
- Most goals in a match: 7
  - Antrim 1–10 : 6–21 Waterford (All-Ireland qualifier)
  - Laois 4–18 : 3–11 Carlow (Relegation final)
- Most points in a match: 49
  - Clare 2–26 :0–23 Waterford (Munster quarter-final)
- Most goals by one team in a match: 6
  - Waterford 6–21 : 1–10 Antrim (All-Ireland qualifier)
  - Galway 6–21 : 0–15 Antrim (All-Ireland qualifier)
- Most goals scored by a losing team: 3
  - Wexford 3–15 : 2–19 Waterford (All-Ireland quarter-final)
  - Carlow 3–11 : 4–18 Laois (Relegation final)
- Most points scored by a losing team: 23
  - Waterford 0–23 : 2–26 Clare (Munster quarter-final)

=== Cards ===
- Most yellow cards: Waterford (16)
- Fewest yellow cards: Galway (1)
- Most red cards: Antrim, Clare, Cork, Laois and Wexford (1)
- Fewest red cards: Waterford, Kilkenny, Tipperary, Limerick, Dublin, Offaly and Galway (0)

=== Overall ===
- Most goals scored – Waterford (12)
- Most points scored – Waterford (111)
- Most goals conceded – Antrim (12)
- Most points conceded – Waterford (122)
- Fewest goals scored – Antrim and Limerick (1)
- Fewest points scored – Carlow (11)
- Fewest goals conceded – Kilkenny (1)
- Fewest points conceded – Carlow and Westmeath (18)

=== Miscellaneous ===
- Kilkenny win their 31st All-Ireland title to become outright leaders on the all-time roll of honour for the first time in their history.
- Top scorer from play John Mullane didn't win an all star.
- Waterford become the second top-scoring team in a hurling championship season to have a negative score difference (Westmeath 1961)

== Roll of Honour ==
- Kilkenny – 31 (2008)
- Cork – 30 (2005)
- Tipperary – 25 (2001)
- Limerick – 7 (1973)
- Dublin – 6 (1938)
- Wexford – 6 (1996)
- Offaly – 4 (1998)
- Galway – 4 (1988)
- Clare – 3 (1997)
- Waterford – 2 (1959)
- Laois – 1 (1915)
- London – 1 (1901)
- Kerry – 1 (1891)

== Player facts ==
=== Debutantes ===
The following players made their début in the 2008 championship:

Player	Team	Date	Opposition	Game
James Burke	Dublin	May 25	Westmeath	Leinster quarter-final
Niall Corcoran	Dublin	May 25	Westmeath	Leinster quarter-final
Noel Costello	Laois	May 25	Offaly	Leinster quarter-final
Joe Dooley	Laois	May 25	Offaly	Leinster quarter-final
Ger Healion	Offaly	May 25	Laois	Leinster quarter-final
Eoin Holohan	Laois	May 25	Offaly	Leinster quarter-final
Niall Holmes	Laois	May 25	Offaly	Leinster quarter-final
Diarmuid Horan	Offaly	May 25	Laois	Leinster quarter-final
Simon Lambert	Dublin	May 25	Westmeath	Leinster quarter-final
Conor Mahon	Offaly	May 25	Laois	Leinster quarter-final
Enda Barrett	Clare	June 1	Waterford	Munster quarter-final
Mark Flaherty	Clare	June 1	Waterford	Munster quarter-final
Richie Foley	Waterford	June 1	Clare	Munster quarter-final
Gary Hurney	Waterford	June 1	Clare	Munster quarter-final
Tadhg Keogh	Clare	June 1	Waterford	Munster quarter-final
Séamus Callanan	Tipperary	June 8	Cork	Munster semi-final
Brian Corry	Cork	June 8	Tipperary	Munster semi-final
Pat Kerwick	Tipperary	June 8	Cork	Munster semi-final
Conor O'Brien	Tipperary	June 8	Cork	Munster semi-final
Paudie O'Sullivan	Cork	June 8	Tipperary	Munster semi-final
Stephen Banville	Wexford	June 14	Dublin	Leinster semi-final
Tommy Dwyer	Wexford	June 14	Dublin	Leinster semi-final
Colm Farrell	Wexford	June 14	Dublin	Leinster semi-final
Peter Kelly	Dublin	June 14	Wexford	Leinster semi-final
Brendan O'Leary	Wexford	June 14	Dublin	Leinster semi-final
David Redmond	Wexford	June 14	Dublin	Leinster semi-final
Paul Ryan	Dublin	June 14	Wexford	Leinster semi-final
James Tonks	Wexford	June 14	Dublin	Leinster semi-final
Richie Hogan	Kilkenny	June 15	Offaly	Leinster semi-final
T.J. Reid	Kilkenny	June 15	Offaly	Leinster semi-final
Paudie O'Dwyer	Limerick	June 22	Clare	Munster semi-final
Joe Canning	Galway	June 28	Antrim	All-Ireland qualifier
Cyril Donnellan	Galway	June 28	Antrim	All-Ireland qualifier
James Skehill	Galway	June 28	Antrim	All-Ireland qualifier
Patrick Bergin	Dublin	July 12	Cork	All-Ireland qualifier
Jamie Nagle	Waterford	July 21	Offaly	All-Ireland qualifier
Paddy Stapleton	Tipperary	August 17	Waterford	All-Ireland semi-final

=== Retirees ===
The following players played their last game in the 2008 championship:

Player	Team	Date	Opposition	Game	Début
Colin Lynch	Clare	July 27	Cork	All-Ireland quarter-final	1997
Frank Lohan	Clare	July 27	Cork	All-Ireland quarter-final	1995
Joe Deane	Cork	August 10	Kilkenny	All-Ireland semi-final	1996
Brian Murphy	Cork	August 10	Kilkenny	All-Ireland semi-final	2004
Diarmuid O'Sullivan	Cork	August 10	Kilkenny	All-Ireland semi-final	1997
Éamonn Corcoran	Tipperary	August 17	Waterford	All-Ireland semi-final	1999
Dave Bennett	Waterford	September 7	Kilkenny	All-Ireland final	1997
Tom Feeney	Waterford	September 7	Kilkenny	All-Ireland final	1995
Paul Flynn	Waterford	September 7	Kilkenny	All-Ireland final	1993
James McGarry	Kilkenny	September 7	Waterford	All-Ireland final	1999

== Top scorers ==
=== Season ===
Rank	Player	County	Tally	Total	Matches	Average
1	Eoin Kelly	Waterford	7–43	64	5	12.8
2	Henry Shefflin	Kilkenny	1–37	40	4	10.0
3	David O'Callaghan	Dublin	2–33	39	4	9.75
3	Joe Canning	Galway	4–27	39	3	13.0
5	Brian Carroll	Offaly	0–37	37	4	9.25
6	Ben O'Connor	Cork	1–32	35	5	7.0
7	Martin Finn	London	1–29	32	3	10.67
8	John Mullane	Waterford	2–21	27	5	5.4
9	Niall Gilligan	Clare	1–21	24	4	6.0
9	Eoin Kelly	Tipperary	1–21	24	3	8.0
11	Eddie Brennan	Kilkenny	4-09	21	4	5.2

=== Single game ===
Rank	Player	County	Tally	Total	Opposition
1	Eoin Kelly	Waterford	2–13	19	Offaly
2	Joe Canning	Galway	2–12	18	Cork
3	Brian Carroll	Offaly	0–16	16	Laois
4	Eoin Kelly	Waterford	1–10	13	Tipperary
5	David O'Callaghan	Dublin	1–9	12	Wexford
5	Ben O'Connor	Cork	0–12	12	Galway
5	Eoin Kelly	Waterford	1–9	12	Kilkenny
5	Joe Canning	Galway	2–6	12	Antrim
9	Henry Shefflin	Kilkenny	0–11	11	Offaly
9	Eoin Kelly	Waterford	1–8	11	Wexford
9	Henry Shefflin	Kilkenny	0–11	11	Cork
9	Joe Bergin	Offaly	3–2	11	Limerick
13	Dave Bennett	Waterford	0–10	10	Clare
13	David O'Callaghan	Dublin	0–10	10	Cork
13	Henry Shefflin	Kilkenny	1–7	10	Wexford
13	Mark Flaherty	Clare	1–7	10	Waterford
13	Eoin Kelly	Tipperary	1–7	10	Cork
13	Eddie Brennan	Kilkenny	2–4	10	Waterford
19	Noel Costello	Laois	0–9	9	Offaly
19	David O'Callaghan	Dublin	0–9	9	Wexford
19	Joe Canning	Galway	0–9	9	Laois
19	Brian Carroll	Offaly	0–9	9	Waterford
19	David O'Callaghan	Dublin	1–6	9	Westmeath
19	Willie Hyland	Laois	2–3	9	Offaly
19	Eoin Kelly	Waterford	2–3	9	Antrim

=== Clean sheets ===
Rank	Goalkeeper	County	Clean sheets
1	P.J. Ryan	Kilkenny	4

== Monthly awards ==
Month	Vodafone Player of the Month		Opel GPA Player of the Month	
Month	Player	County	Player	County
May	Brian Carroll	Offaly	David O'Callaghan	Dublin
June	Brian O'Connell	Clare	Brian O'Connell	Clare
July	Joe Canning	Galway	Joe Canning	Galway
August	Eoin Kelly	Waterford	Derek Lyng	Kilkenny
September	Eddie Brennan	Kilkenny	Eoin Larkin	Kilkenny

== Annual awards ==
=== Vodafone Hurler of the Year ===
The Vodafone Hurler of the Year award for 2008 was won by Eoin Larkin of Kilkenny.

The shortlist for the Vodafone Hurler of the Year award, in alphabetical order, was as follows:

- Eddie Brennan (Kilkenny)
- Eoin Kelly (Waterford)
- Eoin Larkin (Kilkenny)

=== Vodafone Young Hurler of the Year ===
The Vodafone Young Hurler of the Year award for 2008 was won by Joe Canning of Galway.

The shortlist for the Vodafone Young Hurler of the Year award, in alphabetical order, was as follows:

- Séamus Callinan (Tipperary)
- Joe Canning (Galway)
- Cathal Naughton (Cork)

=== Opel GPA Hurler of the Year ===
The Opel GPA Hurler of the Year award for 2008 was won by Eoin Larkin of Kilkenny.

The shortlist for the Opel GPA Hurler of the Year award, in alphabetical order, was as follows:

- Eddie Brennan (Kilkenny)
- Eoin Larkin (Kilkenny)
- Shane McGrath (Tipperary)

== Managerial changes ==
The following managerial changes took place during and immediately after the championship.

Team	Outgoing manager	Manner of departure	Date of vacancy	Replaced by	Date of appointment	Position
Waterford	Justin McCarthy	Resigned	5 June 2008	Davy FitzGerald	9 June 2008	Defeated in Munster quarter-final
Laois	Damien Fox	Resigned	24 June 2008	Niall Rigney	24 June 2008	Defeated in Leinster quarter-final
Limerick	Richie Bennis	Not reappointed	12 August 2008	Justin McCarthy	7 October 2008	Defeated in All-Ireland qualifiers
Dublin	Tommy Naughton	Resigned	14 September 2008	Anthony Daly	23 November 2008	Defeated in All-Ireland qualifiers
Galway	John Meyler	Resigned	7 October 2008	Colm Bonnar	11 November 2008	Defeated in All-Ireland quarter-final
Galway	Ger Loughnane	Not reappointed	13 October 2008	John McIntyre	18 November 2008	Defeated in All-Ireland qualifiers

== Stadia ==
The following stadia were used during the championship:

County	Stadium	Capacity
Dublin	Croke Park	82,300
Tipperary	Semple Stadium	55,000
Limerick	Gaelic Grounds	50,000
Cork	Páirc Uí Chaoimh	43,500
Galway	Pearse Stadium	34,000
Antrim	Casement Park	32,600
Kilkenny	Nowlan Park	30,000
Meath	Páirc Tailteann	30,000
Laois	O'Moore Park	27,000
Carlow	Dr. Cullen Park	21,000
Waterford	Walsh Park	17,000

== See also ==
- 2008 All-Ireland Senior Football Championship
