= David King (hurler) =

Irish hurler

Personal information
- Native name: Daithí Ó Cionga (Irish)
- Born: 1992 (age 33–34) Coolderry, County Offaly, Ireland

Sport
- Sport: Hurling
- Position: Midfield
Club
- Years: Club
- Coolderry
Club titles
- Offaly titles: 4
- Leinster titles: 1
- All-Ireland Titles: 0
Inter-county*
| Years | County | Apps (scores) |
| 2013–present | Offaly | 12 |
Inter-county titles
- Leinster titles: 0
- All-Irelands: 0
- NHL: 0
- All Stars: 0
- *Inter County team apps and scores correct as of 17:53, 15 May 2018.

David King (born 1992) is an Irish hurler who plays as a midfielder for the Offaly senior team.

== Honours ==
Coolderry

- Leinster Senior Club Hurling Championship (1): 2011
- Offaly Senior Hurling Championship (4): 2010, 2011, 2015, 2018

Offaly

- Joe McDonagh Cup (1): 2024
- Christy Ring Cup (1): 2021
- National Hurling League Division 2A (2) 2021, 2023

Sporting positions
| Preceded by Seán Ryan | Offaly senior hurling team captain 2018 | Succeeded by Incumbent |
