= Stephen Corcoran =

Irish hurler

Personal information
- Native name: Stiofán Ó Corcáin (Irish)
- Born: 1990 (age 35–36) Coolderry, County Offaly, Ireland
- Height: 5 ft 9 in (175 cm)

Sport
- Sport: Hurling
- Position: Goalkeeper
Club
- Years: Club
- 2009-present: Coolderry
Club titles
- Offaly titles: 1
- Leinster titles: 1
- All-Ireland Titles: 0
Inter-county*
Years	County	Apps (scores)
2020-2024	Offaly	14 (0-01)
Inter-county titles
- Leinster titles: 0
- All-Irelands: 0
- NHL: 0
- All Stars: 0
- *Inter County team apps and scores correct as of 13:09, 8 April 2026.

Stephen Corcoran (born 1990) is an Irish hurler. At club level, he plays with Coolderry and at inter-county level is a former member of the Offaly senior hurling team.

== Career ==
Corcoran played hurling while in secondary school at St Brendan's Community School in Birr. He began his club career in Coolderry's juvenile and underage ranks before eventually progressing to the adult level. Corcoran won the first of four Offaly SHC medals in 2010, before claiming a Leinster Club SHC title in 2011. He was in goal when Coolderry lost the 2012 All-Ireland club final to Loughgiel Shamrocks.

Corcoran first appeared on the inter-county scene for Offaly as goalkeeper with the under-21 team in 2011. His progression to the senior team took nearly a decade, making his debut in a National Hurling League defeat of Wicklow in 2020. Corcoran was sub-goalkeeper when Offaly beat Derry to win the Christy Ring Cup in 2021. He was again sub-goalkeeper when Offaly claimed the Joe McDonagh Cup title after beating Laois in the 2024 final.

== Honours ==
Coolderry

- Leinster Senior Club Hurling Championship: 2011
- Offaly Senior Hurling Championship: 2010, 2011, 2015, 2018

Offaly

- Joe McDonagh Cup: 2024
- Christy Ring Cup: 2021
- National Hurling League Division 2A: 2021, 2023
