= Joe Brady (hurler) =

Irish hurler (born 1982)

Personal information
- Native name: Seosamh Mac Brádaigh (Irish)
- Born: 12 July 1982 (age 44) Coolderry, County Offaly, Ireland
- Height: 6 ft 4 in (193 cm)

Sport
- Sport: Hurling
- Position: Centre-back
Club
- Years: Club
- Coolderry
Club titles
- Offaly titles: 5
- Leinster titles: 1
- All-Ireland Titles: 0
College
- Years: College
- Waterford Institute of Technology
College titles
- Fitzgibbon titles: 1
Inter-county
Years	County	Apps (scores)
2001-2011	Offaly	31 (2-06)
Inter-county titles
- Leinster titles: 0
- All-Irelands: 0
- NHL: 0
- All Stars: 0

Joseph Brady (born 12 July 1982) is an Irish former Hurler. At club level, he played with Coolderry and at inter-county level with the Offaly senior hurling team.

== Career ==
Brady attended Waterford Institute of Technology and was part of their Fitzgibbon Cup-winning team in 2003.

At club level, Brady first played hurling for Coolderry at juvenile and underage levels. He progressed to adult level and won his first Offaly SHC medal in 2004, following a 3–10 to 2–11 win over Birr in the final. Brady won back-to-back Offaly SHC medals in 2010 and 2011. He later claimed a Leinster Club SHC title and lined out at centre-back in Coolderry's defeat by Loughgiel Shamrocks in the 2012 All-Ireland club final. Brady ended his club career after winning further Offaly SHC titles in 2015 and 2018.

Brady first appeared on the inter-county scene for Offaly as a member of the minor team in 2000 and won a Leinster MHC medal that year. He also spent four consecutive years with the under-21 team after making his first appearance while still a minor. Brady made his senior team debut in a National Hurling League game against Galway in February 2001. He won Division 2 medals in 2005 and 2009. A series of injuries brought Brady's inter-county career to an end in 2011.

== Honours ==
Waterford Institute of Technology

- Fitzgibbon Cup (1): 2003

Coolderry

- Leinster Senior Club Hurling Championship (1): 2011
- Offaly Senior Hurling Championship (5): 2004, 2010, 2011, 2015, 2018

Offaly

- National Hurling League Division 2 (2): 2005, 2009
- Leinster Minor Hurling Championship (1): 2000
