= Cathal Parlon =

Irish hurler

Personal information
- Native name: Cathal Mac Parthaláin (Irish)
- Born: 1986 (age 39–40) Coolderry, County Offaly, Ireland
- Occupation: Engineer

Sport
- Sport: Hurling
- Position: Right wing-back
Club
- Years: Club
- Coolderry
Club titles
- Offaly titles: 5
- Leinster titles: 1
- All-Ireland Titles: 0
College
- Years: College
- 2006-2011: Wateford Institute of Technology
College titles
- Fitzgibbon titles: 1
Inter-county*
Years	County	Apps (scores)
2005-2015	Offaly	20 (0-10)
Inter-county titles
- Leinster titles: 0
- All-Irelands: 0
- NHL: 0
- All Stars: 0
- *Inter County team apps and scores correct as of 20:36, 10 September 2015.

Cathal Parlon (born 1986) is an Irish former hurler. At club level, he played with Coolderry and at inter-county level with the Offaly senior hurling team.

== Career ==
Parlon was educated at Coláiste Phobal Ros Cré in Roscrea and played in all grades of hurling during his time there. He was part of the school's senior team that won Munster and All-Ireland VS JHC titles in 2003. Parlon later played hurling with the Waterford Institute of Technology team and was part of their Fitzgibbon Cup-winning team in 2008.

At club level, Parlon first played hurling for Coolderry at juvenile and underage levels. He progressed to adult level and won his first Offaly SHC medal in 2004, following a 3–10 to 2–11 win over Birr in the final. Parlon won back-to-back Offaly SHC medals in 2010 and 2011. He later claimed a Leinster Club SHC title and lined out at wing-forward in Coolderry's defeat by Loughgiel Shamrocks in the 2012 All-Ireland club final. Parlon ended his club career after winning further Offaly SHC titles in 2015 and 2018.

Parlon first appeared on the inter-county scene for Offaly during a two-year tenure with the minor team in 2003 and 2004. He later progressed to the under-21 team. Parlon made his senior team debut in a National Hurling League game against Derry in February 2005. He was a mainstay of the team for the following decade. Parlon won Division 2 medals in 2005 and 2009. He retired from inter-county hurling in September 2015.

== Family ==
His father, Tom Parlon, also played hurling with Coolderry, was TD for Laois–Offaly from 2002 to 2007.

== Honours ==
Coláiste Phobal Ros Cré

- All-Ireland Vocational Schools Junior Hurling Championship (1): 2003
- Munster Vocational Schools Junior Hurling Championship (1): 2003

Waterford Institute of Technology

- Fitzgibbon Cup (1): 2008

Coolderry

- Leinster Senior Club Hurling Championship (1): 2011
- Offaly Senior Hurling Championship (5): 2004, 2010, 2011, 2015, 2018

Offaly

- National Hurling League Division 2 (2): 2005, 2009
