= Kevin Connolly (hurler) =

Irish hurler

Personal information
- Native name: Caoimhín Ó Conghaile (Irish)
- Born: 1991 (age 34–35) Coolderry, County Offaly, Ireland

Sport
- Sport: Hurling
- Position: Left corner-forward
Club
- Years: Club
- Coolderry
Club titles
- Offaly titles: 4
- Leinster titles: 1
- All-Ireland Titles: 0
Inter-county*
Years	County	Apps (scores)
2011-2019	Offaly	12 (0-06)
Inter-county titles
- Leinster titles: 0
- All-Irelands: 0
- NHL: 0
- All Stars: 0
- *Inter County team apps and scores correct as of 17:09, 8 April 2026.

Kevin Connolly (born 1991) is an Irish hurler. At club level, he plays with Coolderry and at inter-county level is a former member of the Offaly senior hurling team.

== Career ==
At club level, Connolly first played hurling for Coolderry at juvenile and underage levels. He progressed to adult level and won back-to-back Offaly SHC medals in 2010 and 2011. Connolly later claimed a Leinster Club SHC title and came on as a substitute in Coolderry's defeat by Loughgiel Shamrocks in the 2012 All-Ireland club final. He won further Offaly SHC titles in 2015 and 2018.

Connolly first appeared on the inter-county scene for Offaly during a three-year tenure with the minor team. He later lined out with the under-21 team. Connolly made his senior team debut in a National Hurling League game against Cork in February 2011. His last game for the team in June 2019 saw Offaly relegated to the Christy Ring Cup.

== Honours ==
Coolderry

- Leinster Senior Club Hurling Championship (1): 2011
- Offaly Senior Hurling Championship (4): 2010, 2011, 2015, 2018
