= Brendan O'Meara (hurler) =

Irish hurler

Personal information
- Native name: Breandán Ó Meadhra (Irish)
- Born: 1982 (age 43–44) Coolderry, County Offaly, Ireland

Sport
- Sport: Hurling
- Position: Right corner-back
Club
- Years: Club
- Coolderry
Club titles
- Offaly titles: 3
- Leinster titles: 1
- All-Ireland Titles: 0
Inter-county*
Years	County	Apps (scores)
2006-2009	Offaly	6 (0-00)
Inter-county titles
- Leinster titles: 0
- All-Irelands: 0
- NHL: 0
- All Stars: 0
- *Inter County team apps and scores correct as of 15:09, 8 April 2026.

Brendan O'Meara (born 1982) is an Irish former hurler. At club level, he played with Coolderry and at inter-county level with the Offaly senior hurling team.

== Career ==
At club level, O'Meara first played hurling for Coolderry at juvenile and underage levels. He progressed to adult level and won his first Offaly SHC medal in 2004, following a 3–10 to 2–11 win over Birr in the final. O'Meara won further Offaly SHC medals in 2010 and 2011, when he captained the team. He later claimed a Leinster Club SHC title and captained Coolderry to a defeat by Loughgiel Shamrocks in the 2012 All-Ireland club final.

O'Meara first appeared on the inter-county scene for Offaly as a member of the minor team in 2000 and won a Leinster MHC medal that year. He later had a brief stint with the under-21 team. O'Meara made his senior team debut in a National Hurling League game against Cork in February 2006. He won a Division 2 medal in 2009, in what was his last year on the panel.

== Honours ==
Coolderry

- Leinster Senior Club Hurling Championship (1): 2011 (c)
- Offaly Senior Hurling Championship (3): 2004, 2010, 2011 (c)

Offaly

- National Hurling League Division 2 (1): 2009
- Leinster Minor Hurling Championship (1): 2000
