= Brian Carroll (hurler) =

Irish hurler (born 1983)

Personal information
- Native name: Briain Ó Cearúill (Irish)
- Nickname: Carlo
- Born: 13 June 1983 (age 43) Coolderry, County Offaly, Ireland
- Occupation: Secondary school teacher
- Height: 5 ft 8 in (173 cm)

Sport
- Sport: Hurling
- Position: Right corner-forward
Club
- Years: Club
- 2001-present: Coolderry
Club titles
- Offaly titles: 5
- Leinster titles: 1
College
- Years: College
- 2003-2011: University of Limerick
College titles
- Fitzgibbon titles: 1
Inter-county*
Years	County	Apps (scores)
2002-2016	Offaly	49 (5-194)
Inter-county titles
- Leinster titles: 0
- All-Irelands: 0
- NHL: 0
- All Stars: 0
- *Inter County team apps and scores correct as of 22:20, 12 January 2016.

Brian Carroll (born 13 June 1983) is an Irish hurling manager and player, who is the current manager of the Offaly minor hurling team. He plays club hurling with Coolderry and is a former member of the Offaly senior hurling team.

== Early life ==
Born in Coolderry, County Offaly, Carroll's family had a strong association with hurling going back several generations. His grandfather, Jack Carroll, was a goalkeeper with the Offaly senior hurling team, while his great-grandfather, "Red" Jack Teehan, was the first Offaly player to be selected for the Leinster team in the Railway Cup. His father, Pat Carroll, was a two-time All-Ireland SHC medal-winner with Offaly who died in March 1986 at the age of 30.

Carroll went to St Kieran's College in Kilkenny where he played in all grades of hurling. He joined the college's senior team as a 15-year-old and won consecutive Leinster Colleges SHC medals before claiming the All-Ireland Colleges SHC title in 2000. Carroll later attended University of Limerick and won a Fitzgibbon Cup medal in 2011.

== Club career ==
Carroll began his club career with Coolderry and had a hugely successful juvenile and underage career, winning three successive Offaly MHC and three successive U21HC medals in a four-year period between 1999 and 2002. He was just out of the minor grade when he made his senior team debut in 2001.

Carroll won his first Offaly SHC medal following a 3–10 to 2–11 defeat of Birr in the 2004 final. Defeat in consecutive finals over the next two years was followed by back-to-back SHC successes in 2010 and 2011. The latter victory lead to provincial success, with Carroll claiming a Leinster Club SHC medal after a defeat of Oulart–the Ballagh in the final. He scored three points in Coolderry's subsequent defeat by Loughgiel Shamrocks in the 2012 All-Ireland club final.

Carroll had further Offaly SHC successes with Coolderry following defeats of St Rynagh's in 2015 and Kilcormac–Killoughey in 2018. He eventually stepped away from the Coolderry senior team, but continued to line out for the club's second team. Carroll won an Offaly IHC in 2024 after a 3–12 to 1–12 defeat of Drumcullen.

== Inter-county career ==
Carroll was just 15-years-old when he made his first appearance for Offaly in 1999 as a member of the minor team. He spent three years in the minor grade and won a Leinster MHC medal after a 0–13 to 0–08 defeat of Dublin in 2000. Carroll was in his third and final year with the minor team when he was drafted onto Offaly's under-21 team in 2001. He ended his four years in that grade without success.

Carroll made his senior team debut in a Walsh Cup defeat of Dublin in 2002. He was later included on Offaly's National Hurling League panel and quickly became a regular member of the starting fifteen. Carroll made his sole Leinster final appearance in 2004, however, Wexford defeated Offaly by 2–12 to 1–11. He claimed his first senior silverware in 2005 when Offaly secured the National League Division 2 title after a 6–21 to 4–07 defeat of Carlow in the final. Carroll won a second Division 2 medal in 2009 when Wexford were beaten by 1–13 to 0–13 in the final.

Carroll announced his retirement from inter-county hurling in January 2016. At the time of his retirement he was Offaly's all-time top championship scorer.

== Inter-provincial career ==
Carroll's performances at inter-county level resulted in his selection for the Leinster inter-provincial team. He won consecutive Railway Cup medals after defeats of Munster in 2002 and Connacht in 2003. Carroll claimed four winners' medals in total, with further victories in 2008 and 2009.

== Coaching career ==
Carroll served as a coach in Ken Hogan's Lorrha management team when the club claimed the Tipperary IHC title in 2022. He later served as manager of his home club of Coolderry before being appointed manager of the Offaly minor hurling team in November 2024.

== Career statistics ==
Team	Year	National League			Leinster		All-Ireland		Total	
Team	Year	Division	Apps	Score	Apps	Score	Apps	Score	Apps	Score
Offaly	2002	Division 1B	5	0-08	1	0-02	2	0-04	8	0-14
Offaly	2003	Division 1B	7	2-23	1	0-02	3	0-08	11	2-33
Offaly	2004	Division 1B	7	0-11	3	1-10	0	0-00	10	1-21
Offaly	2005	Division 2A	7	0-22	1	0-04	3	1-21	11	1-47
Offaly	2006	Division 1A	6	3-47	2	0-08	3	0-16	11	3-71
Offaly	2007	Division 1A	6	0-13	2	0-04	3	1-09	11	1-26
Offaly	2008	Division 1B	5	2-23	2	0-22	2	0-15	9	2-60
Offaly	2009	Division 2	7	0-27	1	0-03	2	0-15	10	0-45
Offaly	2010	Division 1	7	0-11	3	0-08	2	0-03	12	0-22
Offaly	2011	Division 1	7	0-20	1	0-00	1	0-00	9	0-20
Offaly	2012	Division 1B	—		1	0-02	1	0-01	2	0-03
Offaly	2013	Division 1B	5	0-05	1	0-01	1	0-02	7	0-08
Offaly	2014	Division 1B	7	0-27	1	1-10	1	0-04	9	1-41
Offaly	2015	Division 1B	4	0-06	1	0-03	1	0-00	6	0-09
Career total			80	7-243	21	2-79	25	2-98	126	11-420

== Honours ==
=== Player ===
St Kieran's College

- All-Ireland Colleges Senior Hurling Championship: 2000
- Leinster Colleges Senior Hurling Championship: 1999, 2000

University of Limerick

- Fitzgibbon Cup: 2011

Coolderry

- Leinster Senior Club Hurling Championship: 2011
- Offaly Senior Hurling Championship: 2004, 2010, 2011, 2015, 2018
- Offaly Intermediate Hurling Championship: 2024
- Offaly Under-21 Hurling Championship: 2000, 2001, 2002
- Offaly Minor Hurling Championship: 1999, 2000, 2001

Offaly

- National Hurling League: 2005, 2009
- Leinster Minor Hurling Championship: 2000

Leinster

- Railway Cup: 2002, 2003, 2008, 2009

=== Management ===
Lorrha

- Tipperary Intermediate Hurling Championship: 2022

Sporting positions
Preceded by Ger Oakley	Offaly senior hurling team captain 2010	Succeeded by Shane Dooley
Preceded by Enda Mulhare	Offaly minor hurling team manager 2024-	Succeeded by Incumbent
