= James Burke =

James Burke may refer to:

== Politics ==
- James F. Burke (politician) (1867–1932), United States Representative from Pennsylvania
- James Burke (Australian politician) (born 1971), member of the Northern Territory Legislative Assembly
- James Burke (Cork politician) (died 1936), Irish Cumann na nGaedhael politician and barrister
- James Burke (Roscommon politician) (died 1964), Irish Fine Gael politician and farmer
- James A. Burke (New York politician) (1890–1965), New York City politician and Queens Borough President
- James A. Burke (Massachusetts politician) (1910–1983), U.S. congressman from Massachusetts
- James Edmund Burke (1849–1943), American politician and mayor of Burlington, Vermont

== Sports ==
- James Burke (boxer) (1809–1845), English boxer
- James Burke (cricketer) (born 1991), English cricketer
- James Burke (19th-century footballer), 19th-century football player
- James Burke (Dublin hurler), inter county senior hurler with Dublin
- James Burke (Kildare hurler) (born 1999), Irish hurler
- James Burke (wrestler) (1936–2006), American Olympic wrestler
- Jamie Burke (born 1971), baseball player
- Jamie Burke (rugby union) (born 1980), American rugby union player
- James Burke (baseball), American baseball player for the 1884 Boston Reds
- Jimmy Burke (baseball) (1874–1942), American baseball player
- James Burke (footballer, born 1994), English footballer, see List of Bury F.C. players (1–24 appearances)

== Other fields ==
- James Burke (bishop) (1926–1994), American-born Catholic bishop in Peru
- James Burke (science historian) (born 1936), British broadcaster, author, and television producer
- James E. Burke (1925–2012), CEO of Johnson & Johnson
- James Cobb Burke (1915–1964), American photographer and photojournalist
- James Burke (actor) (1886–1968), appeared in The Maltese Falcon and numerous other films
- James Lee Burke (born 1936), American author
- James Burke (gangster) (1931–1996), Irish-American gangster
- E. James Burke (born 1949), justice of the Wyoming Supreme Court
- James Burke (space engineer) (1925–2023), American lunar settlement and exploration expert, known for the Ranger program
- James F. Burke (musician) (1923–1981), American cornet soloist
- James Burke (police officer), police chief in Suffolk County, New York
- James Wakefield Burke (1906–1989), American journalist and writer

== See also ==
- James Burk (born 1948), sociologist and professor of sociology at Texas A&M University
- Jim Burke (disambiguation)
- Jimmy Burke (disambiguation)
