= Brendan O'Meara =

Brendan O'Meara may refer to:

- Brendan O'Meara (rugby league)
- Brendan O'Meara (hurler)
