= Khin Maung Lat =

Burmese nobleman and courtier

- Thametdaw Thakin
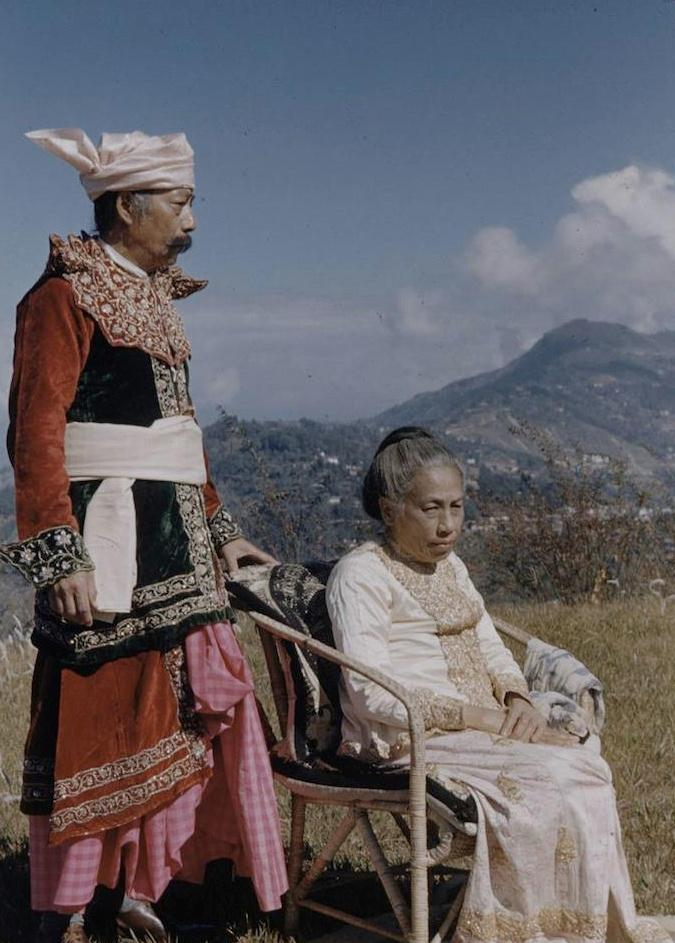
- The photograph of the couple taken by Life photographer James Cobb Burke near their home, c. 1953
- Born: Khin Maung Lat; 19th century Mandalay, Burma
- Died: 1955; Kalimpong, West Bengal, India
- Spouse: Myat Phaya Lat (m. 1917)
- Issue: Maung Lu Gyi (adopted son)
- Father: Khin Maung Gyi
- Mother: Khin Bwa Thit
- Religion: Theravada Buddhism

Khin Maung Lat (Burmese: ခင်မောင်လတ်; ? — 1955), also known as Lat Thakin (Burmese: လတ်သခင်), was a Burmese nobleman and courtier. He had served as Royal Secretary to King Thibaw from 1914 to 1916. He married Princess Myat Phaya Lat, the second daughter of King Thibaw and Queen Supayalat.

== Life ==
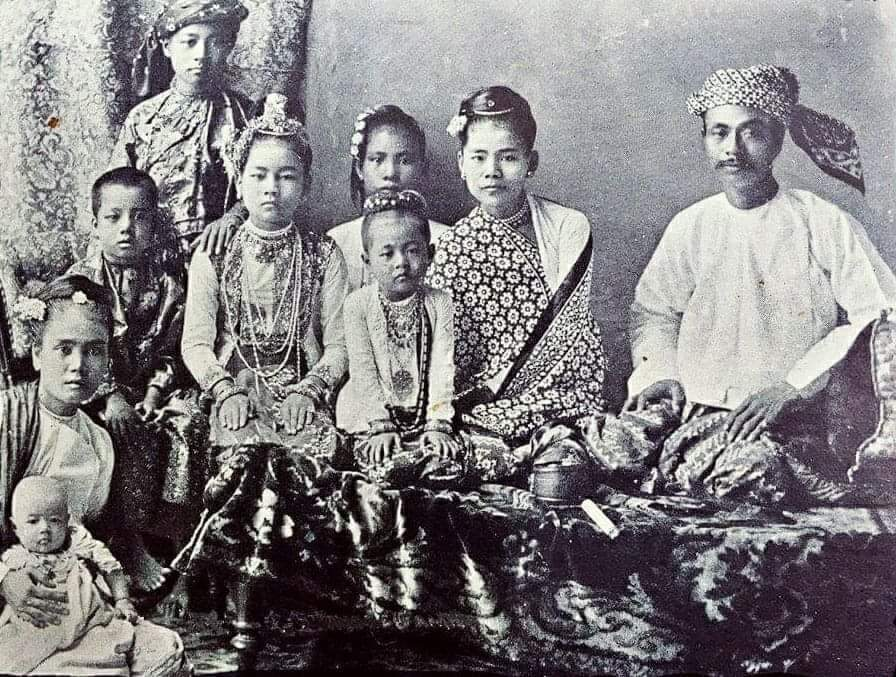
The family of Khin Maung Lat

Khin Maung Lat was the second son of Khin Maung Gyi, the minister for munitions or head of the artillery and duke of Ngape and Mindat, by his wife, Khin Bwa Thit, a maid of honor to Queen Supayalat, and Duchess of Hmanthagyi. His father was a son of Southern Tavoy Commander U Toe and his wife Panhtein Thakhin, who was a daughter of Taingda Mingyi U Pho.

As a young man, he served as a criminal police officer in the British colony of Burma, but soon left for patriotic reasons.

After the exile of King Thibaw to Ratnagiri, his family moved to India in 1911 and continued serving the King. He worked as Thibaw's assistant. While he was in service, Thibaw's second daughter, Myat Phaya Lat, fell in love with him and they eloped on 11 October 1916 due to the disapproval of their parents. They legally married on 20 February 1917 at the Collector's Bungalow, Ratnagiri, Bombay, India. They settled in Kalimpong and started raising dairy cows. They had no children and adopted the son of her Nepalese maidservant, Maung Lu Gyi. Queen Supayalat refused to see the daughter when she eloped with Khin Maung Lat. However Supayalat later met her daughter but refused to meet Khin Maung Lat.

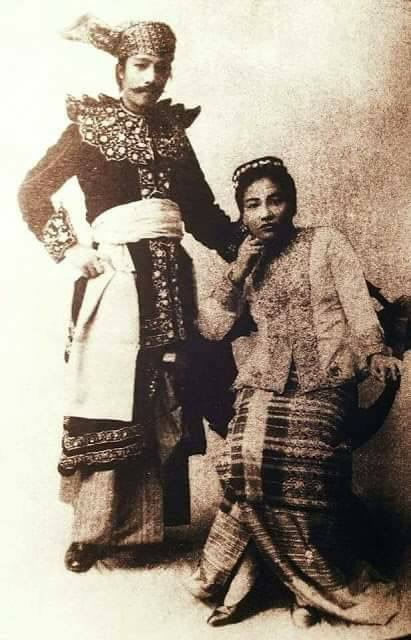
Khin Maung Lat and his wife Myat Phaya Lat, c. 1917–25

Khin Maung Lat always said at government receptions that "if the British government returned the throne, his father-in-law, King Thibaw, had promised to hand him over". He was therefore known as the Burmese Raja (Burmese King) and was regarded with respect throughout the Kalimpong region. He hated the British and put up a large sign in front of his home in Kalimpong saying "Europeans and dogs are not allowed".

He was dissatisfied with and challenged the British governor Harcourt Butler over his unfair decisions in Burmese affairs. He wanted the bodies of King Thibaw and Supayalay to be transported directly to Burma by warship from Bombay. He said, "If this way is not accepted, if there is no compassion for the Burmese people, please allow me to duel fight with the British governor at field". This was covered by the Wun Thanu newspaper on 13 January 1928, reporting that "Khin Maung Lat, also known as Lat Thakin, posed a challenge to duel fight the British governor, Harcourt Butler." He later became a member of Dobama Asiayone, commonly titled Thakin (lit. Lord).

The couple had no money and things worsened in the 1950s when the British quit Burma, and the new government stopped paying gratuities to all royals living outside the country. He died in 1955.
