= Jack Carroll (hurler) =

Irish hurler

Personal information
- Native name: Seán Ó Cearúill (Irish)
- Born: 1921 Coolderry, County Offaly, Ireland
- Died: 1998 (aged 76–77) Coolderry, County Offaly, Ireland

Sport
- Sport: Hurling
- Position: Goalkeeper
Club
- Years: Club
- 1940-1954: Coolderry
Club titles
- Offaly titles: 5
Inter-county
- Years: County
- 1943-1953: Offaly
Inter-county titles
- Leinster titles: 0
- All-Irelands: 0
- NHL: 0
- All Stars: 0

Jack Carroll (1921–1998) is an Irish hurler who played as a goalkeeper for the Offaly senior hurling team.

Carroll made his first appearance for the team during the 1943 championship and was a regular member of the starting fifteen until his retirement after the 1953 championship. During that time he enjoyed little success as Offaly were regarded as one of the minnows of provincial hurling.

At club level Carroll was a five-time county club championship medalist with Coolderry.

Carroll's father-in-law, "Red" Jack Teehan, his son, Pat Carroll, and his grandson, Brian Carroll, also played hurling with Offaly.
