= Paudie O'Dwyer =

Irish hurler

Personal information
- Native name: Páidí Ó Dubhuir (Irish)
- Born: 1982 (age 43–44) Kilmallock, County Limerick, Ireland

Sport
- Sport: Hurling
- Position: Right wing-back
Club
- Years: Club
- Kilmallock
Club titles
- Limerick titles: 2
Inter-county*
Years	County	Apps (scores)
2003-2008	Limerick	11 (0-1)
Inter-county titles
- Munster titles: 0
- All-Irelands: 0
- NHL: 0
- All Stars: 0
- *Inter County team apps and scores correct as of 17:05, 4 November 2012.

Paudie O'Dwyer (born 1982) is an Irish hurler who currently played as a right wing-back for the Limerick senior team.

O'Dwyer made his first appearance for the team during the 2003 National League and was a regular member of the starting fifteen until leaving the panel after the 2008 championship. An All-Ireland medalist in the under-21 grade, he has enjoyed little success as a member of the county senior team. O'Dwyer ended up an All-Ireland runner-up on one occasion.

At club level O'Dwyer is a two-time county club championship medalist with Kilmallock.

== Playing career ==
=== Club ===
O'Dwyer plays his club hurling with Kilmallock and has enjoyed much success.

After losing the 2005 championship decider to Garryspillane, it took five years for Kilmallock to return to the county final. A 1–16 to 1–12 defeat of Emmets on that occasion gave O'Dwyer his first championship medal.

After failing to retain their title, Kilmallock qualified for another championship final in 2012. Adare provided the opposition on that occasion, however, a 1–15 to 0–15 victory gave O'Dwyer a second county championship medal.

=== Inter-county ===
Foley first came to prominence on the inter-county scene as a member of the Limerick under-21 hurling team in 2002. That year Limerick retained the provincial title for the third successive year with O'Dwyer winning a Munster medal following a 1–20 to 2–14 defeat of Tipperary. A subsequent 3–17 to 0-8 trouncing of Galway gave O'Dwyer an All-Ireland Under-21 Hurling Championship medal.

In 2003 O'Dwyer made his senior debut for Limerick in a National Hurling League game against Wexford. Later that season he was a regular at right wing-back during Limerick's unsuccessful championship campaign.

After playing no part for Limerick in 2004, O'Dwyer was recalled to the panel for 2005.

In 2007 O'Dwyer came on as a substitute in Limerick's 3–17 to 1–14 defeat by Waterford in the Munster final. He was an unused substitute in Limerick's subsequent 2–19 to 1–15 defeat by Kilkenny in the All-Ireland final.

O'Dwyer's last game for Limerick was a Munster semi-final defeat by Clare in 2008.

== Honours ==
=== Team ===
Kilmallock

- Limerick Senior Club Hurling Championship (2): 2010, 2012

Limerick

- All-Ireland Under-21 Hurling Championship (1): 2002
- Munster Under-21 Hurling Championship (1): 2002
