= Jimmy Burke =

Jimmy Burke is the name of:

- James Burke (gangster) (1931–1996), Irish-American gangster
- Jimmy Burke (baseball) (1874–1942), American baseball player

== See also ==
- Jim Burke (disambiguation)
- James Burke (disambiguation)
