= Jim Burke =

Jim Burke may refer to:

- Jim Burke (author) (born 1961), American author
- Jim Burke (cricketer) (1930–1979), Australian cricketer
- Jim Burke (illustrator) (born 1973), American illustrator
- Jim Burke (c. 1956–1994), the real name of the prolific letter column contributor T. M. Maple
- Mr. B The Gentleman Rhymer (Jim Burke), British parodist and rapper
- Jim Burke (film producer), American film producer who frequently collaborates with Alexander Payne and Jim Taylor

== See also ==
- James Burke (disambiguation)
- Jimmy Burke (disambiguation)
