= Brian Corry =

Irish sportsperson

Personal information
- Native name: Briain Ó Cobra (Irish)
- Born: June 30, 1995 (age 31) Sixmilebridge, County Clare

Sport
- Sport: Hurling
- Position: Forward
Club
- Years: Club
- Sixmilebridge
Inter-county
Years	County	Apps (scores)
2018-	Clare	1 (0-1)
Inter-county titles
- Munster titles: 0
- All-Irelands: 0

Brian Corry (born 1995 in Sixmilebridge, County Clare) is an Irish sportsperson. He plays hurling with his local club Sixmilebridge and with the Clare senior inter-county team.

== Playing career ==
=== Club ===
Corry plays hurling with his local club in Sixmilebridge. He has enjoyed success with his club winning the Clare Senior Hurling Championship in 2013, 2015, 2017, 2019 and 2020.

=== Inter-county ===
Corry first came to prominence on the inter-county scene as a member of the Clare minor hurling team in 2012. In 2018 Corry was included as a member of the Clare senior hurling panel.
