= Conor Mahon =

Irish hurler

Personal information
- Native name: Conchobhar Ó Mathúna (Irish)
- Born: Kilcormac, County Offaly, Ireland

Sport
- Sport: Hurling
- Position: Centre-forward
Club
- Years: Club
- Kilcormac–Killoughey
Club titles
- Offaly titles: 6
- Leinster titles: 1
- All-Ireland Titles: 0
Inter-county*
Years	County	Apps (scores)
2007 2008-2019	Offaly (SF); Offaly (SH)	2 (0-00); 24 (0-10)
Inter-county titles
- Leinster titles: 0
- All-Irelands: 0
- NHL: 0
- All Stars: 0
- *Inter County team apps and scores correct as of 16:10, 22 December 2024.

Conor Mahon is an Irish hurler. At club level he plays with Kilcormac–Killoughey and at inter-county level he played with the Offaly senior hurling team.

== Career ==
Mahon first played for the Kilcormac–Killoughey club at juvenile and underage levels before progressing to adult level. He played during a successful era for the club and won six Offaly SHC medals between 2012 and 2024. Mahon also won a Leinster Club SHC medal and was an All-Ireland Club SHC runners-up in 2013.

At inter-county level, Mahon first played for Offaly as a dual player at minor level in 2005. He was part of the Offaly minor football team that won the Leinster MFC title in 2006. He later lined out with the Offaly under-21 teams in both codes.

Mahon made his Offaly senior football team debut in a Leinster SFC defeat of Carlow in June 2007. He joined the Offaly senior hurling team the following year. Mahon was a regular member of the team for 11 years and won a National League Division 2 medal in 2009.

== Honours ==
Kilcormac–Killoughey

- Leinster Senior Club Hurling Championship: 2012
- Offaly Senior Hurling Championship: 2012, 2013, 2014, 2017, 2023, 2024
- Offaly Intermediate Football Championship: 2013
- Offaly Junior A Football Championship: 2006, 2012

Offaly

- National Hurling League Division 2: 2009
