= Brian Mullins (hurler) =

Irish hurler

Personal information
- Native name: Brian Ó Maoláin (Irish)
- Born: 1978 (age 47–48) Birr, County Offaly

Sport
- Sport: Hurling
- Position: Goalkeeper
Club
- Years: Club
- Birr
Club titles
- Offaly titles: 10
- Leinster titles: 5
- All-Ireland Titles: 3
Inter-county
- Years: County
- 2005-2010: Offaly
Inter-county titles
- All-Irelands: 0
- NHL: 1

Brian Mullins (born 1978 in Birr, County Offaly) is an Irish sportsperson. He plays hurling with his local club Birr and was a member of the Offaly senior hurling team from 2005 to 2010.

== Playing career ==
=== Club ===
Mullins plays his club hurling with his local club Birr.

=== Inter-county ===
Mullins first came to prominence on the inter-county scene with the Offaly in late 2002 as a sub but did regain his place until 2007 due to the retirement of Stephen Byrne. Mullins retired from Inter-county hurling on 18 November 2010.
