= Stephen Banville =

Irish hurler and Gaelic footballer

Personal information
- Native name: Stiofáin Dé Buinnbhíol (Irish)
- Born: 5 December 1984 (age 41) Ardcavan, County Wexford
- Height: 6 ft 3 in (191 cm)

Sport
- Sport: Hurling
- Position: Full-forward
Club
- Years: Club
- 2003-present: Shelmaliers
Inter-county*
Years	County	Apps (scores)
2008-present	Wexford	11 (4-10)
Inter-county titles
- Leinster titles: 0
- All-Irelands: 0
- NHL: 0
- All Stars: 0
- *Inter County team apps and scores correct as of 20:11, 11 June 2011.

Stephen Banville (born 5 December 1984) is an Irish sportsperson. He plays hurling with his local club Shelmaliers and has been a member of the Wexford senior hurling team since 2008. He has also been part of the Wexford football team. He is an English teacher.
