= 2009 Offaly Senior Hurling Championship =

Annual hurling competition season

- Champions: Tullamore (10th title); Shane Dooley (captain); Kevin Martin (manager)
- Runners-up: Kilcormac–Killoughey; Peter Healion (captain); Johnny Pilkington (manager)

The 2009 Offaly Senior Hurling Championship was the 112th staging of the Offaly Senior Hurling Championship since its establishment by the Offaly County Board in 1896.

Birr entered the championship as the defending champions, however, they were beaten by Tullamore in the semi-finals.

The final was played on 18 October 2009 at O'Connor Park in Tullamore, between Tullamore and Kilcormac–Killoughey, in what was their first ever meeting in the final. Tullamore won the match by 2–12 to 0–11 to claim their 10th championship title overall and a first title in 45 years.

== Results ==
=== Semi-finals ===
3 October 2009 Semi-final	Tullamore	1-17 - 2-12	Birr	O'Connor Park
	S Dooley 0-11 (0-7f); E Finnerty 1-1; F Kerrigan 0-3; K Martin, G Treacy 0-1 each.	Report	S Whelahan 0-6 (0-3f f); G Hanniffy 0-3; D Molloy 1-0; B Harding 0-2 (0-2f); D Hayden 0-1.

4 October 2009 Semi-final	Kilcormac–Killoughey	5-16 - 3-16	Coolderry	O'Connor Park
	B Leonard 2-4, D Currams 2-3, Ciaran Slevin 1-4, K Leonard 0-1, C Mahon 0-1, E Lee 0-1, J Gorman 0-1, K Grogan 0-1.		C Parlon 3-2, D Murray 0-8, M Corcoran 0-2, E Ryan 0-2, B Carroll 0-1, J Masterson 0-1.

=== Final ===
18 October 2009 Final	Tullamore	3-15 - 1-12	Kilcormac–Killoughey	O'Connor Park
	S Dooley 0-7 (2f, 0-1 '65), K Martin 1-1, G Treacy 1-0, S Kelly, E Finnerty, F Kerrigan, J Duffy 0-1 each.	Report	B Leonard 0-4 (0-2 '65), M Leonard 0-3, C Slevin 0-2 (2f), J Gorman, D Currams 0-1 each.
