= Aidan Treacy =

Irish hurler

Personal information
- Native name: Aodán Ó Treasaigh (Irish)
- Born: 1991 (age 34–35) Banagher, County Offaly, Ireland

Sport
- Sport: Hurling
- Position: Centre-back
Club
- Years: Club
- St Rynagh's
Club titles
- Offaly titles: 2
Inter-county
- Years: County
- 2017-2021: Offaly
Inter-county titles
- Leinster titles: 0
- All-Irelands: 0
- NHL: 0
- All Stars: 0

Aidan Treacy (born 1991) is an Irish hurler who plays for Offaly Championship club St Rynagh's and at inter-county level with the Offaly senior hurling team. He usually lines out as a centre-back.

== Career ==
Born in Banagher, County Offaly, Treacy first came to hurling prominence at juvenile and underage levels with the St Rynagh's club. He eventually progressed onto the club's senior team and has since won two County Championship titles. Treacy first appeared on the inter-county scene with the Offaly under-21 team during the 2012 Leinster Championship. He made his first appearance with the Offaly senior hurling team during the 2017 National League. Treacy secured his first silverware during the 2021 season, when Offaly claimed the National League Division 2A and Christy Ring Cup titles.

== Honours ==
St Rynagh's

- Offaly Senior Hurling Championship: 2016, 2019

Offaly

- Christy Ring Cup: 2021
- National Hurling League Division 2A: 2021
