= 2000 All-Ireland Minor Hurling Championship =

All-Ireland Minor Hurling Championship 2000
Championship Details
- Dates: 22 April 2000 – 10 September 2000
- Teams: 16

All Ireland Champions
- Winners: Galway (5th win)
- Captain: Richie Murray
- Manager: John Hardiman

All Ireland Runners-up
- Runners-up: Cork
- Captain: Mark O'Connor
- Manager: John Considine

Provincial Champions
- Munster: Cork
- Leinster: Offaly
- Ulster: Antrim
- Connacht: Not Played

Championship Statistics
- Matches Played: 22
- Top Scorer: Brian Carroll (2-39)

The 2000 All-Ireland Minor Hurling Championship was the 70th staging of the All-Ireland Minor Hurling Championship since its establishment by the Gaelic Athletic Association in 1928. The championship began on 22 April 2000 and ended on 10 September 2000.

Galway entered the championship as the defending champions.

On 10 September 2000, Galway won the championship following a 2-19 to 4-10 defeat of Cork in the All-Ireland final. This was their fifth All-Ireland title overall and their second title in-a-row.

Offaly's Brian Carroll was the championship's top scorer with 2-39.

== Results ==
=== Leinster Minor Hurling Championship ===
Round robin

	Team	Pld	W	D	L	SF	SA	SD	Pts
1	Dublin	3	3	0	0	9-31	4-34	12	6
2	Offaly	3	2	0	1	7-54	4-26	37	4
3	Laois	3	1	0	2	5-24	5-35	-11	2
4	Westmeath	3	0	0	3	0-19	9-41	-49	0

22 April 2000 Round 1	Dublin	4-08 - 1-13	Offaly	Parnell Park, Dublin
	C Ryan (1-5), S O'Neill (2-1), S Quinn (1-0), C O'Driscoll (0-2).		B Carroll (1-5), N Coughlan (0-2), G Rafferty (0-2), S Browne (0-2), J Clendennin (0-1), M Cordiao (0-1).

22 April 2000 Round 1	Westmeath	0-05 - 3-07	Laois	Cusack Park, Mullingar
	J Shaw 0-2, B Murtagh 0-1, J Coyle 0-1, E Loughlin 0-1.		E Jackman 1-2, N Costello 1-0, J Hooban 1-0, S O'Dwyer 0-2, C Coonan 0-2, C O'Neill 0-1.

12 May 2000 Round 2	Laois	2-07 - 2-09	Dublin	O'Moore Park, Portlaoise
	C Coonan 1-3, F Deegan 1-0, C O'Neill 0-1, E Jackman 0-1, A Kingsley 0-1, P Grey 0-1.		S O'Neill 1-1, D O'Callaghan 1-1, C Ryan 0-4, C O'Driscoll 0-2, G Joyce 0-1.

12 May 2000 Round 2	Offaly	3-20 - 0-08	Westmeath	St. Brendan's Park, Birr
	B Carroll 0-11, J Clendennin 2-2, R Hanniffy 1-3, G Gardiner 0-2, S Browne 0-1, M Cordial 0-1.		C Whyte 0-4, J Shaw 0-2, R Whelan 0-1, E Coughlan 0-1.

27 May 2000 Round 3	Laois	0-10 - 3-21	Offaly	Kelly Delly Park, Rathdowney
	P Grey 0-6, M McEvoy 0-1, C Coonan 0-1, S Dwyer 0-1, T Fitzgerald 0-1.		R Hanniffy 2-6, B Carroll 1-8, G Rafferty 0-2, M Cordial 0-2, S Brown 0-1, M Corcoran 0-1, N Coughlan 0-1.

17 June 2000 Round 3	Dublin	3-14 - 0-06	Westmeath	Parnell Park, Dublin
	S O'Neill 2-2, D O'Callaghan 1-2, S McCann 0-3, C White 0-2, F Chambers 0-1, B Meads 0-1, D Flanagan 0-1, D Baker 0-1, B Rushe 0-1.		D Carty 0-2, R Whelan 0-2, J Shaw 0-1, M McNicholas 0-1.

Semi-finals

24 June 2000 Semi-final	Dublin	3-09 - 1-14	Wexford	Dr. Cullen Park, Carlow
	S O’Neill 3-2, C Ryan 0-3, G Joyce 0-3, S McCann 0-1		D Mythen 0-9, M Cash 1-0, R Jacob 0-2, A Flynn 0-2, L Gleeson 0-1	Referee: P Aherne (Carlow)

24 June 2000 Semi-final	Offaly	4-12 - 2-10	Kilkenny	Dr. Cullen Park, Carlow
	B Carroll 0-7, R Hanniffy 2-0, K Kelly 1-1, J Larkin 1-0, S Brown 0-2, M Cordial 0-2.		M Phelan 0-5, K Rafter 1-0, E McCormack 1-0, P Reid 0-2, A Fogarty 0-2, C Phelan 0-1.	Referee: J Kelly (Wexford)

Final

9 July 2000 Final	Offaly	0-13 - 0-08	Dublin	Croke Park, Dublin
	R Hanniffy 0-5, B Carroll 0-3, K Kelly 0-2, S Brown 0-1, N Coughlan 0-1, G Gardiner 0-1.		C Ryan 0-3, K Elliott 0-2, C Keaney 0-2, G Joyce 0-1.	Referee: P Dunphy (Kilkenny)

=== Munster Minor Hurling Championship ===
Quarter-finals

19 April 2000 Quarter-final	Kerry	3-09 - 4-12	Clare	Austin Stack Park, Tralee
	A Boyle 2-1, B Donovan 0-6 (0-5f), G O'Brien 1-0, M Conway 0-2 (65 and f)	Report	B Colbert 4-2, D McMahon 0-7 (0-5f), P Vaughan, A Fleming and B Loughnane 0-1 each.	Referee: J O'Mahony (Limerick)

26 April 2000 Quarter-final	Waterford	1-06 - 1-12	Tipperary	Walsh Park, Waterford
	E Kelly 0-5, B Power 1-0, S Ryan 0-1.		E Kelly 0-7, J O'Brien 1-2, P Horgan, T Minogue and T Doyle 0-1 each.

Semi-finals

10 May 2000 Semi-final	Cork	1-09 - 0-10	Clare	Gaelic Grounds, Limerick
	T O'Leary 1-2, E Collins 0-3, D Cashman 0-2, S O'Sullivan 0-1, M O'Connor 0-1.		A Quinn 0-7, D McMahon 0-2, A O'Loughlin 0-1.	Referee: S Roche (Tipperary)

10 May 2000 Semi-final	Limerick	2-19 - 4-13	Tipperary	Bruff GAA Field
	N Moran (0-6), P Tobin (0-5), P McElligott (1-1), A O'Shaughnessy (0-4), M McKenna (1-0), E Foley (0-1), A O'Connor (0-1), B Geoghegan (0-1).	Report	E Kelly (2-11), A Horgan (1-0), R O'Brien (1-0), J O'Brien (0-2).	Referee: D Kirwan (Cork)

17 May 2000 Semi-final replay	Tipperary	0-13 - 1-12	Limerick	Semple Stadium, Thurles
	E Kelly (0-11), J O'Brien (0-1), J Kennedy (0-1).	Report	N Moran (0-5), P Tobin (0-5), A O'Shaughnessy (1-1), P McElligott (0-1).	Referee: J Dunne (Kerry)

Final

2 July 2000 Final	Cork	2-19 - 1-10	Limerick	Semple Stadium, Thurles
	T O'Leary 0-6, S O'Sullivan 1-2, E Collins 1-1, K Murphy 0-4, M O'Connor 0-3, B Carey 0-1, G McLoughlin 0-1, J O'Neill 0-1.		M McKenna 1-2, N Moran 0-5, A O'Connor 0-1, P Tobin 0-1, A O'Shaughnessy 0-1.	Referee: S Roche (Tipperary)

=== Ulster Minor Hurling Championship ===
Semi-final

11 June 2000 Semi-final	Derry	2-18 - 0-15	Down	Casement Park, Dublin
	D McMullen 2-0, P Doherty 0-6, P Hearty 0-4, J Kelly 0-4, C Brunton 0-2, P Farren 0-2.		P Braniff 0-8, M O’Neill 0-2, S Clarke 0-2, K Keating 0-1, E Dynes 0-1, E Clarke 0-1.	Referee: T McIntyre (Antrim)

Final

2 July 2000 Final	Antrim	2-11 - 1-09	Derry	Casement Park, Belfast
	C Stewart 1-4, S Óg McFadden 1-1, S Delargy 0-3, K McGourty 0-1, B Quinn 0-1.		P Hearty 0-5, J Kelly 1-0, D Magill 0-1, P Doherty 0-1, P Farren 0-1, HP Kelly 0-1.	Referee: G Devlin (Armagh)

=== All-Ireland Minor Hurling Championship ===
Quarter-finals

21 July 2000 Quarter-final	Galway	0-23 - 1-07	Limerick	Cusack Park, Ennis
	G Farragher 0-9, R Murray 0-3, T Kavanagh 0-3, D Hayes 0-2, A Cullinane 0-2, J O'Connell 0-2, K Brady 0-1, K Hayes 0-1.		M McKenna 1-0, N Moran 0-3, A O'Connor 0-2, E Foley 0-1, P Tobin 0-1.	Referee: B Kelly (Westmeath)

23 July 2000 Quarter-final	Dublin	3-13 - 0-11	Antrim	Croke Park, Dublin
	D O'Callaghan 2-3, S Fee 1-0, G Joyce 0-3, C Ryan 0-3, C Keaney 0-2, S McCann 0-1, C O'Driscoll 0-1.		S Delargy 0-5, C O'Grady 0-3, G Cunningham 0-1, S Óg McFadden 0-1, B Quinn 0-1.	Referee: S Roche (Tipperary)

Semi-finals

6 August 2000 Semi-final	Cork	2-17 - 1-11	Dublin	Croke Park, Dublin
	K Murphy (Sarsfields) 1-6, E Collins 1-2, S Ó hAilpín 0-4, M O'Connor 0-3, D Cashman 0-1, T O'Leary 0-1.		S O'Neill 1-2, C Ryan 0-4, G Joyce 0-2, D O'Callaghan 0-1, C Keaney 0-1, F Chambers 0-1.	Referee: P Aherne (Carlow)

13 August 2000 Semi-final	Galway	3-14 - 2-13	Offaly	Croke Park, Dublin
	D Greene 2-1, D Hayes 1-2, G Farragher 0-4, R Murray 0-3, P Garvey 0-2, T Kavanagh 0-2.		B Carroll 0-5, N Coughlan 1-1, K Kelly 1-1, R Hanniffy 0-2, J Larkin 0-2, G Rafferty 0-1, M Cordial 0-1.	Referee: T McIntyre (Antrim)

Final

10 September 2000 Final	Galway	2-19 - 4-10	Cork	Croke Park, Dublin
	D Greene 2-2, G Farragher 0-8, D Hayes 0-3, R Murray 0-2, JP O'Connell 0-2f, T Kavanagh 0-1, A Cullinane 0-1.		K Murphy (Sarsfields) 2-4, S Ó hAilpín 1-1, T O'Leary 1-0, M O'Connor 0-2, E Collins 0-1, S O’Sullivan 0-1, C Brosnan 0-1.	Referee: B Kelly (Westmeath)

== Championship statistics ==
=== Top scorers ===
Top scorers overall

Rank	Player	Club	Tally	Total	Matches	Average
1	Brian Carroll	Offaly	2-39	45	6	7.50
2	Shane O'Neill	Dublin	9-08	35	6	5.83
2	Eoin Kelly	Tipperary	2-29	35	3	11.66
3	Rory Hanniffy	Offaly	5-16	31	6	5.16
4	Conor Ryan	Dublin	1-22	25	6	4.16
5	Kieran Murphy	Cork	3-14	23	4	5.75
6	Ger Farragher	Galway	0-21	21	3	7.00
7	David O'Callaghan	Dublin	3-14	19	7	2.71
7	Niall Moran	Limerick	0-19	19	4	4.75
8	David Greene	Galway	4-03	15	3	5.00
8	Tomás O'Leary	Cork	2-09	15	4	3.75

Top scorers in a single game

Rank	Player	Club	Tally	Total	Opposition
1	Eoin Kelly	Tipperary	2-11	17	Limerick
2	Brian Colbert	Clare	4-02	14	Kerry
3	Rory Hanniffy	Offaly	2-06	12	Laois
4	Shane O'Neill	Dublin	3-02	11	Wexford
4	Brian Carroll	Offaly	1-08	11	Laois
4	Eoin Kelly	Tipperary	0-11	11	Limerick
4	Brian Carroll	Offaly	0-11	11	Westmeath
5	Kieran Murphy	Cork	2-04	10	Galway
6	David O'Callaghan	Dublin	2-03	9	Antrim
6	Kieran Murphy	Cork	1-06	9	Dublin
6	Ger Farragher	Galway	0-09	9	Limerick
6	Des Mythen	Wexford	0-09	9	Dublin
