= James Cobb Burke =

American photographer and photojournalist

James Cobb Burke (1915–1964) was an American photographer and photojournalist. He was born in Shanghai in 1915 to Methodist missionary parents. The family settled in Macon, Georgia, and Burke studied English at Emory University, graduating in 1937. He also attended Princeton briefly, before becoming a newspaper reporter.

During WW2, he served Claire Chennault's 14th Air Force in Kunming, and published a book titled My Father in China. After the war, he stayed on in China and joined Time-Life magazine as a stringer in 1947. After the Communist takeover of China, he moved to India where he eventually became New Delhi bureau chief of Time-Life magazine. He switched from writing to photographic reporting in the mid-1950s. He is best known today for his photojournalism in the postcolonial subcontinent in the 1950s and 1960s, covering India, Pakistan and the rest of the region. He also traveled widely across Asia. His archives are available in Getty Images.

In October 1964, he slipped and fell to his death 60 miles (97 km) north of Tezpur, Assam, while trying to take a picture in the Himalayas. He was 49 years old and left behind a wife and three children.
