= James Burke (Dublin hurler) =

Irish hurler

Personal information
- Native name: Séamus de Búrca (Irish)
- Born: Ireland

Sport
- Sport: Hurling
- Position: Back
Club
- Years: Club
- ? -Present: ?
Club titles
- Dublin titles: 1
Inter-county
- Years: County
- 2008 - Present: Dublin
Inter-county titles
- Leinster titles: 0

James Burke is an inter-county senior hurler with Dublin. He made his Championship debut in May 2008 against Westmeath.
