= David O'Callaghan (dual player) =

Irish hurler and Gaelic footballer

Personal information
- Native name: Daithí Ó Ceallacháin (Irish)
- Nickname: Dotsy
- Born: 18 October 1983 (age 43) Dublin, Ireland
- Occupation: Games Promotion Officer
- Height: 1.75 m (5 ft 9 in)

Sport
- Football Position: Right Corner Forward
- Hurling Position: Right Corner Forward
Club
- Years: Club
- 2000–2018: St Mark's
Inter-county*
Years	County	Apps (scores)
2003–2007 2008–2017	Dublin (F); Dublin (H)	? (6-82)
Inter-county titles
	Football	Hurling
Leinster Titles	2	1
All-Ireland Titles	0	0
League titles	0	1
All-Stars	0	0
- *Inter County team apps and scores correct as of November 2017.

David O'Callaghan (born 18 October 1983) is an Irish hurler who plays at right corner forward on the Dublin county team. He is a former dual player having represented the Dublin county football team between 2003 and 2007. O'Callaghan currently plays his club hurling for his home club St Mark's. He retired from the sport in November 2017.

== Playing career ==
Speaking in 2020, O'Callaghan recalled that he initially focused on hurling during his youth, despite early interest from football selectors. He described his first Leinster minor hurling final appearance in 2000 at Croke Park as overwhelming, admitting he struggled with nerves on the occasion. The following year, he briefly switched to football, enjoying a successful minor campaign that included an appearance in an All-Ireland final, which brought him into greater prominence.

O'Callaghan made a decision in 2005 to concentrate on Gaelic football. O'Cllaghan has two Leinster senior football medals, although he is yet to establish himself as a player on the starting panel. O'Callaghan's club St Marks won the Senior Club Hurling 'B' Championship in 2006. O'Callaghan finished the game with a total of 0-05 points in the clubs famous victory. St Marks won the Intermediate championship in 2005 taking them to the Senior Club Hurling 'B' championship in 2006 and now this year's win will entitle the club to play in the 'A' championship with Dublin's top clubs. In honour of O'Callaghan's hurling club performances for St Marks in 2006, he was named on the 2006 Dublin Bus/Evening Herald Blue Star hurling XV. He won the Leinster Minor Football Championship with Dublin in 2001.

He later balanced both codes at under-21 and senior levels but experienced recurring hamstring injuries. O’Callaghan noted that management increasingly encouraged players to specialise, though he valued any opportunity to represent Dublin. After limited involvement with the senior football team in the mid-2000s, he stepped away in 2007 to travel, citing a belief that he was not central to the team's plans and a long-standing ambition to return to hurling.

== 2007 ==
2007 started very well for O'Callaghan, he scored 2-5 (0-1f) against the Dublin Blue Stars in a challenge match which saw Dublin win by a scoreline of 3–17 to 0–12. His prolific form continued in Dublin's opening game of the O'Byrne Cup with O'Callaghan notching a 1–4 score in a game that Dublin comfortably won. Dublin and O'Callaghan progress to the quarter-final against Westmeath. He pulled off another scoring performance against Westmeath (1-01), a game which Dublin easily won. He won the 2007 O'Byrne Cup with Dublin against Laois at O'Connor Park in Offaly. The game finished on a scoreline of 1–18 to 2–13 against Laois. He failed to score in the O'Byrne Cup final. He failed to score in the final and therefore finished the tournament with a total of 2-5 (0-1f). After spending most of the 2007 National Football League on the bench for Dublin, Dotsy decided to retire from Dublin senior football. It was rumoured that Dotsy may have been defecting to the Dublin senior hurling panel but this rumour proved to be untrue. O'Callaghan will be travelling to the United States for the summer months.

== 2008 ==
Rejoining the Dublin hurling setup in 2008, he became part of a developing team that gained momentum under successive management, particularly following the appointment of Anthony Daly. He highlighted improved professionalism, increased public interest, and gradual on-field progress, including a National League title in 2011 and a run to the All-Ireland semi-finals.

In 2008, O'Callaghan returned to the Senior Hurling panel and made his championship return against Westmeath in the Leinster Senior Hurling Championship. Dublin won the game by 3–21 to 0–11 with 'Dotsy' contributing a total of 1-06 (0-01f).

O’Callaghan described subsequent years as inconsistent, noting a disappointing 2012 season influenced by high expectations and personal bereavement. However, he identified 2013 as a breakthrough year, when Dublin defeated Kilkenny in the Leinster Championship for the first time in over 70 years and went on to win the Leinster title. He characterised this period as a high point, marked by strong team belief and momentum.

In 2015 O’Callaghan transferred from St Mark's to Ballyboden St Enda's in order to maintain a competitive standard of play. He cited a decline in hurling participation in west Dublin, particularly in Tallaght, where gaps in underage structures and player losses had weakened clubs. O’Callaghan suggested that a combined Tallaght team could help restore standards, noting that the growth of soccer, especially the influence of Shamrock Rovers, was drawing young players away from hurling. Despite these concerns, he expressed optimism about the Dublin senior hurling team under new manager Ger Cunningham, highlighting improved organisation and a positive environment for players.

== Retirement ==
While still a forward for St Mark's GAA, in October 2016, O’Callaghan underwent surgery after being diagnosed with nerve damage caused by a prolapsed disc. Despite these setbacks, he briefly considered a return to inter-county hurling following the appointment of Pat Gilroy—the 2011 All-Ireland-winning football manager—as Dublin senior hurling manager.

O’Callaghan attended a regional trial and undertook a period of intensive training to assess his readiness to return to competitive play. However, ongoing minor injuries and a lack of renewed motivation led him to conclude that retirement was the appropriate decision. He subsequently confirmed his intention to step away from the sport.

O’Callaghan has expressed satisfaction with his career and the contributions he made during his time as a player.

“Stepping away from it was really hard when you’ve put so much into it, but at that time it was nearly such a relief to say ‘right, it’s time to get away from this’. I had some marvellous times, but, from a personal view, I think you know when it’s time to step away."

On 21 August 2023, Round Tower GAA Club announced the appointment of O'Callaghan as Club Games Promotion Officer (GPO). He was appointed following prior coaching and GPO experience with other clubs in the county, succeeding Shane Treanor.
