= 2012 All-Ireland Senior Club Hurling Championship final =

2012 All-Ireland Senior Club Hurling Championship Final
- Event: 2011–12 All-Ireland Senior Club Hurling Championship
Loughgiel Shamrocks	Coolderry
4-13	0-17
- Date: 17 March 2012
- Venue: Croke Park, Dublin
- Man of the Match: Liam Watson
- Referee: Alan Kelly (Galway)
- Attendance: 25,412

The 2012 All-Ireland Senior Club Hurling Championship final was a hurling match played at Croke Park on 17 March 2012 to determine the winners of the 2011–12 All-Ireland Senior Club Hurling Championship, the 42nd season of the All-Ireland Senior Club Hurling Championship, a tournament organised by the Gaelic Athletic Association for the champion clubs of the four provinces of Ireland. The final was contested by Loughgiel Shamrocks of Antrim and Coolderry of Offaly, with Loughgiel Shamrocks winning by 4-13 to 0-17.

The All-Ireland final was a unique occasion as it was the first ever championship meeting between Loughgiel Shamrocks and Coolderry. It remains their only clash in the All-Ireland series. Loughgiel were hoping to win the final for the first time since 1983 while Coolderry were hoping to win the All-Ireland title for the first time.

Coolderry eased into a 0-3 to 0-1 lead, with Damien Murray converting a couple of frees, however, Shay Casey fired in Loughgiel's first goal after just six minutes. Eddie McCloskey and Brendan McCarry fired over points, and they could have had more but for some solid defending from Joe Brady. Coolderry's Cathal Parlon and Brian Carroll brought the Leinster champions level, but a second Loughgiel goal from Liam Watson in the 18th minute gave the Antrim side a massive lift. Two more goals in as many minutes from Watson secured the hat-trick and left Coolderry with a 10-point deficit.

Loughgiel led by 4-6 to 0-9 at the interval, but an inspired Coolderry threw everything into attack on the restart, and within five minutes they had trimmed a nine points deficit back to five. Substitute Kevin Connolly brought a terrific save from D. D. Quinn, and along with Murray and Parlon, clipped over points to give them renewed hope. Loughgiel weathered the storm, thanks in no small part to some heroic defending from Paul Gillan, and hit back with scores from Watson and Barney McAuley. Watson landed a point from a tight angle to stretch the lead out to eight with Coolderry struggling. Murray pulled back a couple of points from expertly struck frees and Eoin Ryan steered over a neat score, but there was to be no stopping the Shamrocks, with Watson powering over an 80-metre free, before McCarry pointed after Stephen Corcoran had pulled off a top quality save from Casey.

Loughgiel's victory secured their second All-Ireland title. They joined Sarsfield's, St. Finbarr's and Glen Rovers in joint seventh position on the all time roll of honour.

== Match ==
=== Details ===
17 March 2012

Loughgiel Shamrocks	4-13 - 0-17	Coolderry
L Watson 3-7 (1-6f), S Casey 1-0, E McCarry 0-3, E McCloskey, J Scullion, B McAuley 0-1 each.		D Murray 0-8 (8fs), B Carroll 0-3, C Parlon, E Ryan 0-2 each, K Brady, K Connolly 0-1 each.

Croke Park, Dublin
Attendance: 25,412
Referee: A Kelly (Galway)

Loughgiel Shamrocks	Coolderry
