= 2018 Offaly Senior Hurling Championship =

Annual hurling competition season

- Dates: 31 March – 8 October 2018
- Teams: 8
- Sponsor: Molloy Environmental
- Champions: Coolderry (31st title); Kevin Connolly (captain); Joachim Kelly (manager)
- Runners-up: Kilcormac–Killoughey; Conor Slevin (captain); Stephen Byrne (manager)
- Relegated: Seir Kieran

Tournament statistics
- Matches played: 34
- Goals scored: 72 (2.12 per match)
- Points scored: 1089 (32.03 per match)
- Top scorer(s): Aidan Treacy (1–82)

The 2018 Offaly Senior Hurling Championship was the 121st staging of the Offaly Senior Hurling Championship since its establishment by the Offaly County Board in 1896. The championship ran from 31 March to 8 October 2018.

Kilcormac–Killoughey entered the championship as the defending champions.

The final was played on 7 October 2018 at Bord na Móna O'Connor Park in Tullamore, between Coolderry and Kilcormac–Killoughey, in what was their first ever meeting in the final. Coolderry won the match by 2–17 to 0–17 to claim their 31st championship title overall and a first title in three years.

== Team changes ==
=== From championship ===
Relegated to the Offaly Senior B Hurling Championship

- Clodiagh Gaels
- Lusmagh
- Shamrocks
- Tullamore

== Group stage ==
=== Group stage table ===
Semi-finalists Quarter-finalists Relegation playoff

Team	Matches				Score			Pts
Team	Pld	W	D	L	For	Against	Diff	Pts
Coolderry	7	4	3	0	154	123	31	11
Kilcormac–Killoughey	7	4	1	2	143	137	6	9
Birr	7	4	1	2	131	137	-6	9
St Rynagh's	7	3	2	2	133	121	12	8
Shinrone	7	2	3	2	150	135	15	7
Belmont	7	3	0	4	140	139	1	6
Seir Kieran	7	2	0	5	135	161	-26	4
Kinnitty	7	0	2	5	108	140	-32	2

=== Group stage results ===
31 March 2018 Round 1	St Rynagh's	1-14 - 2-17	Seir Kieran	St Brendan's Park
	A Treacy 0-10, S Wynne 1-0, S Quirke 0-2, M Maloney 0-1, P Quirke 0-1.		J Bergin 1-11, A Hynes 1-1, K Dunne 0-2, B Kealey 0-2, T Carroll 0-1.

31 March 2018 Round 1	Coolderry	1-13 - 0-16	Kilcormac–Killoughey	St Brendan's Park
	B Carroll 0-8, K Connolly 1-1, D King 0-1, E Parlon 0-1, M Bergin 0-1, W Malone 0-1.		C Slevin 0-8, T Geraghty 0-3, C Kiely 0-2, J Gorman 0-2, D Murray 0-1.

1 April 2018 Round 1	Belmont	3-11 - 0-08	Kinnitty	Páirc Naomh Raghnach
	O Kelly 2-2, L Fox 0-5, D Cox 1-1, D Kelly 0-2, A Egan 0-1.		C Coughlan 0-5, O Kealey 0-2, E Callaghan 0-1.

1 April 2018 Round 1	Birr	2-13 - 0-14	Shinrone	Páirc Naomh Raghnach
	E Nolan 1-3, E Cahill 0-6, T Bolger 1-1, D Quegan 0-2, S Lonergan 0-1.		C Doughan 0-6, S Cleary 0-3, B Loughnane 0-1, M Morkan 0-1, D Morkan 0-1, D Cleary 0-1, A Cleary 0-1.

14 April 2018 Round 2	Seir Kieran	1-12 - 0-18	Coolderry	St Mary's Field
	A Hynes 0-6, K Dunne 1-1, J Bergin 0-3, D Mooney 0-2.		B Carroll 0-10, K Connolly 0-3, E Parlon 0-1, C Molloy 0-1, D Miller 0-1, J Brady 0-1, D Parlon 0-1.

14 April 2018 Round 2	Kinnitty	0-18 - 2-12	Birr	Páirc Naomh Raghnach
	C Coughlan 0-8, S Kinsella 0-5, J Molloy 0-2, P Delaney 0-1, A Kealey 0-1, O Kealey 0-1.		E Cahill 0-5, T Bolger 1-0, S Ryan 1-0, C Mulrooney 0-2, M Verney 0-1, B Murphy 0-1, C Taylor 0-1, B Harding 0-1, E Nolan 0-1.

15 April 2018 Round 2	Shinrone	0-14 - 0-14	St Rynagh's	St Brendan's Park
	C Doughan 0-5, D Morkan 0-3, JP Cleary 0-2, J Sampson 0-1, B Loughnane 0-1, M Morkan 0-1, C Cleary 0-1.		A Treacy 0-8, S Wynne 0-4, P Camon 0-1, B Conneely 0-1.

15 April 2018 Round 2	Kilcormac–Killoughey	0-17 - 1-20	Belmont	St Brendan's Park
	C Slevin 0-10, J Gorman 0-2, C Mahon 0-2, T Geraghty 0-1, P Geraghty 0-1, D Murray 0-1.		O Kelly 1-3, L Fox 0-6, D Nally 0-3, D Cox 0-3, C Egan 0-2, K Nugent 0-1, J Maher 0-1, A Egan 0-1.

30 June 2018 Round 3	St Rynagh's	0-21 - 0-13	Kinnitty	St Brendan's Park
	A Treacy 0-9, S Wynne 0-2, E Woods 0-2, P Quirke 0-2, S Quirke 0-2, D Shortt 0-1, R Hughes 0-1, G Kelly 0-1, G Scales 0-1.		C Coughlan 0-9, S Kinsella 0-1, S Molloy 0-1, A Kealey 0-1, O Kealey 0-1.

1 July 2018 Round 3	Seir Kieran	2-16 - 3-26	Shinrone	St Brendan's Park
	J Bergin 0-9, A Hynes 1-2, P Mulrooney 1-0, K Murray 0-1, T Carroll 0-1, B Kealey 0-1, S Dunne 0-1, S Ryan 0-1.		D Cleary 1-4, D Morkan 0-7, J Sampson 1-3, S Cleary 1-3, D Morkan 0-3, A Cleary 0-2, C Cleary 0-2, M Cleary 0-1, D Doughan 0-1.

1 July 2018 Round 3	Birr	1-20 - 2-22	Kilcormac–Killoughey	Páirc Naomh Raghnach
	E Cahill 0-7, C Mulrooney 1-2, T Bolger 0-3, S Lonergan 0-2, E Nolan 0-2, B Watkins 0-1, C Shortt 0-1, S Ryan 0-1, E Pilkington 0-1.		C Kiely 1-6, C Slevin 1-3, T Geraghty 0-3, J Gorman 0-3, D Murray 0-3, C Lowry 0-2, S Leonard 0-1, P Geraghty 0-1.

1 July 2018 Round 3	Coolderry	5-17 - 0-18	Belmont	St Brendan's Park
	B Carroll 1-8, K Connolly 2-2, D King 1-2, C Molloy 1-1, D Parlon 0-2, M Corcoran 0-1, W Malone 0-1.		L Fox 0-14, D Nally 0-1, D Cox 0-1, O Kelly 0-1, J Maher 0-1.

14 July 2018 Round 4	Kinnitty	0-16 - 2-11	Seir Kieran	St Mary's Field
	C Coughlan 0-10, S Kinsella 0-3, B Donnelly 0-2, O Kealey 0-1.		K Dunne 1-2, J Bergin 0-5, T Carroll 1-0, A Hynes 0-2, B Connors 0-1, B Kealey 0-1.

15 July 2018 Round 4	Kilcormac–Killoughey	2-11 - 1-19	St Rynagh's	St Brendan's Park
	D Murray 1-4, C Kiely 0-4, C Slevin 1-0, C Mahon 0-1, J Gorman 0-1, P Geraghty 0-1.		S Quirke 1-3, A Treacy 0-6, G Scales 0-3, J O'Connor 0-2, G Kelly 0-2, R Hughes 0-1, M Maloney 0-1, S Wynne 0-1.

15 July 2018 Round 4	Shinrone	2-18 - 1-21	Coolderry	St Brendan's Park
	D Doughan 0-5, S Cleary 0-5, D Morkan 0-4, A Cleary 1-0, B Teehan 1-0 (og), D Morkan 0-2, M Cleary 0-1, D Cleary 0-1.		B Carroll 0-10, D King 0-3, E Parlon 0-3, D Miller 1-0, K Connolly 0-2, D Parlon 0-2, W Malone 0-1.

15 July 2018 Round 4	Belmont	0-16 - 0-18	Birr	Kilcormac GAA Grounds
	L Fox 0-5, D Nally 0-3, J Maher 0-3, C Egan 0-1, R McEvoy 0-1, O Kelly 0-1, D Egan 0-1, D Cox 0-1.		E Cahill 0-10, B Harding 0-3, E Nolan 0-1, P Cleary 0-1, D Watkins 0-1, T Bolger 0-1, C Mulrooney 0-1.

27 July 2018 Round 5	Shinrone	0-19 - 0-19	Kinnitty	Coolderry Grounds
	C Doughan 0-3, JP Cleary 0-3, D Doughan 0-3, J Sampson 0-3, S Cleary 0-2, A Cleary 0-2, C Ryan 0-1, M Morkan 0-1, D Morkan 0-1.		C Coughlan 0-11, O Kealey 0-4, E Callaghan 0-1, A Kealey 0-1, J Dempsey 0-1, S Kinsella 0-1.

28 July 2018 Round 5	Seir Kieran	0-18 - 2-16	Kilcormac–Killoughey	Kinnitty Grounds
	J Bergin 0-9, T Carroll 0-3, A Hynes 0-3, D Mooney 0-1, B Connors 0-1, E Murphy 0-1.		C Slevin 0-9, G Healion 1-0, C Lowry 1-0, T Geraghty 0-3, P Geraghty 0-2, J Gorman 0-1, D Murray 0-1.

29 July 2018 Round 5	Coolderry	1-19 - 1-19	Birr	Rath Grounds
	B Carroll 0-11, E Parlon 1-0, K Connolly 0-3, S Corcoran 0-1, C Molloy 0-1, M Bergin 0-1, D King 0-1, D Parlon 0-1.		E Cahill 0-6, C Mulrooney 1-0, B Harding 0-2, O Murphy 0-1.

29 July 2018 Round 5	St Rynagh's	1-18 - 0-16	Belmont	Lusmagh Grounds
	A Treacy 1-12, P Quirke 0-3, S Wynne 0-2, R Hughes 0-1.		D Nally 0-8, L Fox 0-6, D Cox 0-2.

11 August 2018 Round 6	Belmont	2-24 - 0-18	Seir Kieran	St Brendan's Park
	D Nally 0-14, O Kelly 2-0, J Maher 0-2, C Egan 0-2, D Cox 0-2, D Egan 0-1, A Egan 0-1, D Kelly 0-1, S Nally 0-1.		J Bergin 0-6, J Mulrooney 0-5, S Coughlan 0-2, A Hynes 0-2, D Mooney 0-1, C Connors 0-1, S Ryan 0-1.

11 August 2018 Round 6	Kilcormac–Killoughey	1-17 - 1-16	Shinrone	Páirc Naomh Raghnach
	C Slevin 1-9, P Geraghty 0-2, J Gorman 0-2, C Mahon 0-1, T Geraghty 0-1, G Healion 0-1, C Lowry 0-1.		JP Cleary 1-4, D Doughan 0-4, D Morkan 0-3, A Cleary 0-2, S Cleary 0-1, J Sampson 0-1, D Cleary 0-1.

12 August 2018 Round 6	Kinnitty	2-12 - 1-19	Coolderry	Clareen Grounds
	C Coughlan 0-8, S Kinsella 1-1, J Dempsey 1-1, B Donnelly 0-1, E Callaghan 0-1.		B Carroll 0-5, K Connolly 0-5, S Corcoran 0-4, J Brady 1-0, D Parlon 0-2, D King 0-1, C Molloy 0-1, W Malone 0-1.

12 August 2018 Round 6	Birr	0-18 - 0-17	St Rynagh's	St Brendan's Park
	E Cahill 0-12, B Watkins 0-1, P Cleary 0-1, O Murphy 0-1, S Lonergan 0-1, E Nolan 0-1, T Bolger 0-1.		A Treacy 0-11, M Maloney 0-3, D Shortt 0-1, G Scales 0-1, S Quirke 0-1.

26 August 2018 Round 7	Seir Kieran	1-19 - 2-17	Birr	Lusmagh Grounds
	S Ryan 1-3, J Bergin 0-5, J Mulrooney 0-3, K Dunne 0-2, A Hynes 0-2, C Connors 0-2, E Murphy 0-1, K Murray 0-1.		E Cahill 0-10, C Mulrooney 1-1, P Cleary 1-0, E Pilkington 0-2, E Nolan 0-2, S Ryan 0-1, T Bolger 0-1.

26 August 2018 Round 7	Coolderry	3-11 - 0-20	St Rynagh's	Rath Grounds
	B Carroll 1-7, K Connolly 1-3, M Culleton 1-0, M Bergin 0-1.		A Treacy 0-10, G Kelly 0-4, J O'Connor 0-3, G Conneely 0-1, P Quirke 0-1, R Hughes 0-1.

26 August 2018 Round 7	Kinnitty	1-13 - 2-17	Kilcormac–Killoughey	Bord na Móna O'Connor Park
	O Kealey 1-7, E Callaghan 0-2, K Bergin 0-1, S Molloy 0-1, A Flaherty 0-1, J Hardiman 0-1.		C Quinn 1-2, C Slevin 0-5, C Kiely 1-1, T Geraghty 0-3, D Murray 0-2, P Geraghty 0-2, C Mahon 0-1, J Gorman 0-1.

26 August 2018 Round 7	Shinrone	3-16 - 2-11	Belmont	Crinkill Grounds
	S Cleary 2-3, JP Cleary 0-4, D Morkan 1-0, C Ryan 0-2, C Doughan 0-2, A Cleary 0-2, D Doughan 0-1, J Sampson 0-1, M Morkan 0-1.		O Kelly 1-2, D Nally 0-5, C Egan 1-1, M Egan 0-1, D Egan 0-1, L Fox 0-1.

== Relegation stage ==
=== Relegation playoff ===
15 September 2018 Playoff	Seir Kieran	0-13 - 0-14	Kinnitty	St Brendan's Park
	J Bergin 0-5, C Connors 0-2, S Ryan 0-2, A Hynes 0-2, K Dunne 0-1, J Mulrooney 0-1.		C Coughlan 0-8, O Kealey 0-3, K Bergin 0-2, A Kealey 0-1.

== Knockout stage ==
=== Quarter-finals ===
8 September 2018 Quarter-final	St Rynagh's	0-17 - 0-14	Shinrone	St Brendan's Park
	A Treacy 0-8, D Short 0-2, S Dolan 0-2, G Conneely 0-2, R Hughes 0-1, S Wynne 0-1, J O'Connor 0-1.		JP Cleary 0-5, D Doughan 0-4, A Cleary 0-3, J Sampson 0-1, S Cleary 0-1.

9 September 2018 Quarter-final	Belmont	1-14 - 0-15	Birr	Bord na Móna O'Connor Park
	D Nally 0-7, D Egan 1-1, J Maher 0-3, C Egan 0-1, D Cox 0-1, S Nally 0-1.		E Cahill 0-6, T Bolger 0-2, C Mulrooney 0-2, E Nolan 0-2, C Taylor 0-1, B Watkins 0-1, B Harding 0-1.

=== Semi-finals ===
22 September 2018 Semi-final	Kilcormac–Killoughey	1-16 - 1-11	St Rynagh's	Bord na Móna O'Connor Park
	C Slevin 0-7, T Geraghty 1-3, C Kiely 0-3, C Mahon 0-2, E Grogan 0-1.		A Treacy 0-8, R Hughes 1-0, S Wynne 0-1, S Dolan 0-1, S Quirke 0-1.

23 September 2018 Semi-final	Coolderry	4-13 - 3-15	Belmont	St Brendan's Park
	B Carroll 1-6, E Parlon 1-1, C Molloy 1-0, M Corcoran 1-0, K Connolly 0-3, S Corcoran 0-1, D King 0-1, D Miller 0-1.		O Kelly 3-3, D Nally 0-6, L Fox 0-3, J Nally 0-1, M Egan 0-1, J Maher 0-1.

=== Final ===
8 October 2018 Final	Coolderry	2-17 - 0-17	Kilcormac–Killoughey	Bord na Móna O'Connor Park
	B Carroll 0-10 (0-6f, 0-2 65’s), K Connolly 1-2, E Parlon 1-0, M Corcoran, C Molloy, S Corcoran (f), D King, K Brady 0-1.	Report	C Slevin 0-6 (0-4f), C Mahon 0-3, D Murray, C Kiely, T Geraghty 0-2 each, D Currams and J Gorman 0-1 each.	Referee: S Guinan

== Championship statistics ==
=== Top scorers ===
Rank	Player	Club	Tally	Total	Matches	Average
1	Aidan Treacy	St Rynagh's	1-82	85	9	9.44
2	Brian Carroll	Coolderry	3-75	84	9	9.33
3	Ciarán Slevin	Kilcormac–Killoughey	3-57	66	9	7.33
4	Eoghan Cahill	Kilcormac–Killoughey	0-62	62	8	7.75
5	Colm Coughlan	Kinnitty	0-59	59	7	8.42
6	Joe Bergin	Seir Kieran	1-53	56	8	7.00
7	David Nally	Belmont	0-47	47	9	5.22
8	Leon Fox	Belmont	0-40	40	9	4.44
9	Oisín Kelly	Belmont	9-12	39	8	4.87
9	Kevin Connolly	Coolderry	5-24	39	9	4.33
