= 2004 Offaly Senior Hurling Championship =

Annual hurling competition season

- Sponsor: Aidan Bracken Design
- Champions: Coolderry (27th title); Joe Brady (captain); Joe Tynan (manager)
- Runners-up: Birr; Brian Mullins (captain); Pad Joe Whelehan (manager)

The 2004 Offaly Senior Hurling Championship was the 107th staging of the Offaly Senior Hurling Championship since its establishment by the Offaly County Board in 1896.

Birr were the defending champions.

The final was played on 10 October 2004 at St Brendan's Park in Birr, between Coolderry and Birr, in what was their first ever meeting in the final in 56 years. Coolderry won the match by 3–10 to 2–11 to claim their 27th championship title overall and a first title in 18 years.

== Results ==
=== Semi-finals ===
25 September 2004 Semi-final	Birr	1-15 - 1-10	St Rynagh's	Rath Grounds
	S Whelehan 0-7, S Brown 0-4, D Hayden 1-1, G Cahill 0-2, D Pilkington 0-1.		J Ryan 1-1, C Horan 0-3, P Mulhare 0-3, D Tanner 0-1, M Rigney 0-1.

26 September 2004 Semi-final	Coolderry	2-08 - 1-07	Kilcormac–Killoughey	St Brendan's Park
	P Teehan 1-2, B Carroll 0-3, D Dooley 1-0, D Murray 0-1, C Parlon 0-1, M Corcoran 0-1.		E Lee 1-1, C Slevin 0-3, D Gleeson 0-1, T Spain 0-1, C Cassidy 0-1.

=== Final ===
10 October 2004 Final	Coolderry	3-10 - 2-11	Birr	St Brendan's Park
	P Teehan 2-0, C Parlon 0-5, P O'Connor 1-0, B Carroll 0-3, D Murray 0-1, D Dooley 0-1.		D Hayden 2-0, S Whelehan 0-6, S Brown 0-2, D Pilkington 0-1, P O'Meara 0-1, B Whelehan 0-1.
