= 2011 Offaly Senior Hurling Championship =

Annual hurling competition season

- Champions: Coolderry (29th title); Brendan O'Meara (captain); Ken Hogan (manager)
- Runners-up: Birr; Dylan Hayden (captain); Paul Murphy (manager)

The 2011 Offaly Senior Hurling Championship was the 114th staging of the Offaly Senior Hurling Championship since its establishment by the Offaly County Board in 1896.

Coolderry entered the championship as the defending champions.

The final was played on 16 October 2011 at O'Connor Park in Tullamore, between Coolderry and Birr, in what was their sixth meeting in the final overall and a first meeting in the final in five years. Coolderry won the match by 2–14 to 0–16 to claim their 29th championship title overall and a second title in succession.

== Knockout stage ==
=== Semi-finals ===
2 October 2011 Semi-final	Birr	2-09 - 1-05	St Rynagh's	O'Connor Park
	S Ryan 1-2, B Lonergan 1-0, D Hayden 0-2, T Bolger 0-2, B Murphy 0-1, R Hanniffy 0-1, G Hanniffy 0-1.		G Scales 1-2, G Kelly 0-2, G Healy 0-1.

2 October 2011 Semi-final	Coolderry	3-14 - 1-09	Kilcormac–Killoughey	O'Connor Park
	D Murray 1-7, C Parlon 1-1, M Corcoran 1-0, B Teehan 0-3, K Teehan 0-1, B Carroll 0-1, K Connolly 0-1.		C Slevin 0-4, J Gorman 1-0, T Geraghty 0-1, T Fletcher 0-1, C Cassidy 0-1, B Leonard 0-1, P Geraghty 0-1.

=== Final ===
16 October 2011 Final	Coolderry	2-14 - 0-16	Birr	O'Connor Park
	D Murray 0-8 (4f and 1 '65'), E Ryan 1-2, K Connolly 1-0, K Brady 0-2, C Parlon and B Teehan 0-1 each;		T Bolger 0-8 (6f), D Hayden 0-3, B Harding 0-2 (1f and 1 '65), S Ryan, P Molloy and G Hanniffy 0-1 each.	Referee: B Gavin (Clara)
