= 2011–12 All-Ireland Senior Club Hurling Championship =

All-Ireland Senior Club Hurling Championship 2011–12
Championship Details
- Dates: 9 October 2011 – 17 March 2012
- Teams: 15

All Ireland Champions
- Winners: Loughgiel Shamrocks (2nd win)
- Captain: Johnny Campbell
- Manager: P. J. Mullan

All Ireland Runners-up
- Runners-up: Coolderry
- Captain: Brendan O'Meara
- Manager: Ken Hogan

Provincial Champions
- Munster: Na Piarsaigh
- Leinster: Coolderry
- Ulster: Loughgiel Shamrocks
- Connacht: Not Played

Championship Statistics
- Matches Played: 15
- Total Goals: 36 (2.4 per game)
- Total Points: 411 (27.4 per game)
- Top Scorer: Liam Watson (4–30)

The 2011–12 All-Ireland Senior Club Hurling Championship was the 42nd staging of the All-Ireland hurling club championship since its establishment by the Gaelic Athletic Association in 1970. The draw for the 2011–12 fixtures took place in August 2011. The championship began on 9 October 2011 and ended on 17 March 2012. Clarinbridge were the defending champions, however, they did not qualify for the championship.

Loughgiel Shamrocks secured the title with a 4–13 to 0–17 defeat of Coolderry in the All-Ireland final. This was their second All-Ireland title.

== Teams ==
A total of fifteen teams contested the championship, including all of the teams from the 2010–11. The Armagh champions did not participate.

The 2011–12 championship also saw a number of first-time participants. Carrigtwohill of Cork won their first county championship since 1918 and represented the county in the provincial series. Similarly, Na Piarsaigh in Limerick and Drom-Inch in Tipperary won their very first county titles and contested the Munster series for the first time.

== Team summaries ==
=== Participating clubs ===
Team	County	Captain	Manager(s)	Most recent success		
Team	County	Captain	Manager(s)	All-Ireland	Provincial	County
Ballyboden St. Enda's	Dublin	David Curtin	Liam Hogan			2010
Ballycran	Down		Mick Braniff; Gary Savage		1993	2009
Ballygunner	Waterford	Shane O'Sullivan	Niall O'Donnell		2001	2009
Carrigtwohill	Cork	Brian Lordan	James O'Connor			1918
Clonkill	Westmeath	Andrew Mitchell	Pat O'Toole			2009
Clough/Ballacolla	Laois	John A. Delaney	John O'Sullivan			2009
Coolderry	Offaly	Brendan O'Meara	Ken Hogan			2010
Crusheen	Clare	Gerry O'Grady	Michael Browne			2010
Drom-Inch	Tipperary	Séamus Callanan	Teddy Kennedy			
Gort	Galway	Andy Coen	Mattie Murphy		1983	1983
James Stephens	Kilkenny	Jackie Tyrrell	Niall Rigney	2005	2005	2005
Kevin Lynch's	Derry	Eoighin Farren	David McCloskey			2009
Loughgiel Shamrocks	Antrim	Johnny Campbell	P. J. Mullan	1983	2010	2010
Na Piarsaigh	Limerick	Kieran Bermingham	Seán Stack			
Oulart the Ballagh	Wexford	Keith Rossiter	Liam Dunne			2010

== Fixtures ==
=== Leinster Senior Club Hurling Championship ===
6 November 2011
Quarter-final

James Stephens	0–15 – 2–12	Oulart-the-Ballagh
E Larkin 0–11 (0-8f, 0–1 65); D McCormack, N Tyrell, M Ruth, E McCormack, 0–1 each.	Report	E Moore 1–4 (0-1f); N Kirwan 0–4 (0-4f); S Murphy 1–0 (f); R Jacob 0–2; D Nolan, S Doyle, 0–1 each.

Nowlan Park, Kilkenny
Referee: B Kelly (Westmeath)

6 November 2011
Quarter-final

Clonkill	1–13 – 2–12	Ballyboden St. Enda's
B. Murtagh (1–5, 0–1 from a free), A. McGrath (0–3 from frees), A. Mitchell (0–3, 0–1 from a free, 0–1 from ‘65), Anthony Price (0–1), A. Dowdall (0–1).	Report	P. Ryan (0–8, 0–5 frees, 0–1 from ‘65), S. Lambert (1–1), C. McCormack (1–1), M. Travers (0–1), D. O’Connor (0–1).

Cusack Park, Mullingar
Referee: F Smith (Meath)

13 November 2011
Semi-final

Oulart-the-Ballagh	3–12 – 2–11	Clough/Ballacolla
E Moore 1–4, 3f; S Murphy 1–1; R Jacob 1–0; G Sinnott, M Jacob 0–2 each; D Redmond, S Doyle, D Nolan 0–1 each.	Report	M McEvoy 1–2; W Dunphy 1–1; W Hyland (3f), S Maher 0–3 each; J Delaney (f), M Dunphy 0–1 each.

Wexford Park, Wexford
Referee: D Hughes (Carlow)

13 November 2011
Semi-final

Coolderry	1–18 – 0–15	Ballyboden St. Enda's
D Murray 0–8 (0-7f), C Parlon 0–6, E Ryan 0–4, B Teehan 1–0.	Report	P Ryan 0–6 (0-3f, 0–1 65), N McMorrow, D O’Connor, S Lambert 0–2 each, C McCormack, D Curtin, S O’Connor 0–1 each.

Parnell Park, Dublin
Referee: A Stapleton (Laois)

27 November 2011
Final

Oulart-the-Ballagh	1–11 – 1–15	Coolderry
E. Moore 0–4 (0–2 fs); N. Kirwan 0–3 (0–1 f), P. Roche 1–0 (f); D. Nolan 0–2; S. Doyle, R. Jacob 0–1 each.	Report	C. Parlon 1–3; D. Murray 0–6 (0–4 fs); B. Carroll 0–3; E. Ryan, K. Connolly, B. Teehan 0–1 each.

Nowlan Park, Kilkenny
Attendance: 4,610
Referee: J McGrath (Westmeath)

=== Munster Senior Club Hurling Championship ===
30 October 2011
Quarter-final

Drom-Inch	1–13 – 2–15	Ballygunner
S Callanan 1–6 (0-6f); Johnny Ryan 0–3; James Ryan, James Woodlock, S Butler, D Collins, 0–1 each.	Report	Pauric Mahony 0–9 (0-6f); Brian O’Sullivan 1–2; JJ Hutchinson 1–0; S Power 0–2; S O’Sullivan, Barry O’Sullivan, 0–1 each.

Semple Stadium, Thurles
Referee: C Lyons (Cork)

13 November 2011
Semi-final

Ballygunner	0–12 – 3–9	Na Piarsaigh
P. Mahony 0–7 (0–5 fs, 0–1 65); S. O’Sullivan 0–2; B. O’Sullivan, JJ Hutchinson, D. O’Sullivan 0–1 each.	Report	S. Dowling 2–4 (0–4 fs); D. Breen 1–0; K. Ryan 0–2; A. Breen, P. Gleeson, B. Hartnett, 0–1.

Walsh Park, Waterford
Referee: D Copps (Cork)

13 November 2011
Semi-final

Carrigtwohill	1–10 – 0–19	Crusheen
M Fitzgerald 1–3 (0-2f); N McCarthy 0–3; S Dineen, T Hogan, B Lordan, L O’Sullivan, 0–1 each.	Report	P Vaughan 0–6 (0-5f, 1 ‘65’); P Meaney 0–3; D Forde 0–3; J Fitzgibbon 0–3; F Kennedy, G O’Grady, G O’Donnell, A Brigdale, 0–1 each.

Páirc Uí Chaoimh, Cork
Referee: J Ryan (Tipperary)

27 November 2011
Final

Na Piarsaigh	1–11 – 0–14	Crusheen
S Dowling 1–7 (1-0pen, 0-6f); A Breen, D Breen, C King, J Madden, 0–1 each.	Report	P Vaughan 0–5 (0-3f, 0–1 65); P Meaney 0–2; F Kennedy 0–2; C O’Doherty (f), Cathal Dillon, J Fitzgibbon, D Forde, G O’Grady, 0–1 each.

Semple Stadium, Thurles
Referee: J Ryan (Tipperary)

4 December 2011
Final replay

Na Piarsaigh	1–13 – 0–9	Crusheen
A Breen 1–3, S Dowling 0–3 (2fs, 0–1 65), K Downes, D Breen 0–2 each, K Kennedy, K Ryan, C King 0–1 each.	Report	J Fitzgibbon 0–4, P Vaughan 0–3 (2fs), T Meaney, D Forde, 0–1 each.

Semple Stadium, Thurles
Referee: C McAllister (Cork)

=== Ulster Senior Club Hurling Championship ===
9 October 2011
Semi-final

Loughgiel Shamrocks	2–15 – 1–8	Kevin Lynch's
L Watson 1–7 (1-6f), B McCarry 1–3, Declan Laverty 0–3, J Scullion (1 s-l), D McCloskey 0–2 each, Damian Laverty 0–1.	Report	P McCloskey 1–1, K Hinphey, P Kelly (1f) 0–2 each.

Casement Park, Belfast
Referee: D. Magee (Down)

23 October 2011
Final

Loughgiel Shamrocks	2–18 – 0–8	Ballycran
E McCloskey 1–2 (1f), M McCarry 1–1, Declan Laverty, B McAuley, D McCloskey (3fs) 0–3 each, J Scullion, James Campbell 0–2 each, Damian Laverty, M McFadden 0–1 each.	Report	S Nicholson 0–3 (2fs), J Coyle, S Wilson (1 65) 0–2 each, A Clarke 0–1.

Casement Park, Belfast
Referee: E. Hasson (Derry)

=== All-Ireland Senior Club Hurling Championship ===
11 February 2012
Semi-final

Na Piarsaigh	2–13 – 0–27	Loughgiel Shamrocks
S Dowling (0–6, 4f, 2 '65), D Breen (1–2), R Sheehan (1–0), C King (0–1), P Gleeson (0–1), S O'Neill (0–1), K Downes (0–1), A Breen (0–1).	Report	L Watson (0–16, 9f, 1 '65), J Scullion (0–3), E McCloskey (0–3), D Laverty (0–2), B McCarry (0–2), M McFadden (0–1).

Parnell Park, Dublin
Referee: A Stapleton (Laois)

11 February 2012
Semi-final

Coolderry	3–16 – 0–17	Gort
D Murray (1–8, 0-5f), C Parlon (1–2), E Ryan (1–0), B Carroll (0–2), B Teehan (0–2), K Teehan (0–1), M Corcoran (0–1).	Report	G Quinn 0–10 (0-6f, 0–2 '65'), G O'Donoughue (0–2), B Regan (0–1), J Grealish (0–1), A Harte (0–1), R Cummins (0–1), O Fahy (0–1).

Gaelic Grounds, Limerick
Referee: J Sexton (Cork)

17 March 2012
Final

Loughgiel Shamrocks	4–13 – 0–17	Coolderry
L Watson 3–7 (1-5f), S Casey 1–0, B McCarry 0–3, B McAuley, E McCloskey, J Scullion 0–1 each.	Report	D Murray 0–8 (8f), B Carroll 0–3, E Ryan, C Parlon 0–2 each, K Brady, K Connolly 0–1 each.

Croke Park, Dublin
Attendance: 25,412
Referee: A Kelly (Galway)

== Championship statistics ==
=== Scoring ===
- First goal of the championship: Patrick McCloskey for Kevin Lynch's against Loughgiel Shamrocks.
- Last goal of the championship: Liam Watson for Loughgiel Shamrocks against Coolderry.

== Championship statistics ==
=== Top scorers ===
Top scorers overall

	Player	Club	Tally	Total	Games	Average
1	Liam Watson	Loughgiel Shamrocks	4–30	42	4	10.5
2	Damien Murray	Coolderry	1–30	33	4	8.25
3	Shane Dowling	Na Piarsaigh	3–20	29	4	7.25
4	Cathal Parlon	Coolderry	2–13	19	4	6.75
5	Eoin Moore	Oulart-the Ballagh	2–12	18	4	4.50
6	Pauric Mahony	Ballygunner	0–16	16	2	8.00
7	Pat Vaughan	Crusheen	0–14	14	3	4.66
7	Paul Ryan	Ballyboden St. Enda's	0–14	14	2	7.00
9	David Breen	Na Piarsaigh	2-05	11	4	2.75
9	Brendan McCarry	Loughgiel Shamrocks	1-08	11	4	2.75
9	Eoin Larkin	James Stephens	0–11	11	1	11.00

Top scorers in a single game

	Player	Club	Tally	Total	Opposition
1	Liam Watson	Loughgiel Shamrocks	3-07	16	Coolderry
1	Liam Watson	Loughgiel Shamrocks	0–16	16	Na Piarsaigh
2	Damien Murray	Coolderry	1-08	11	Gort
2	Eoin Larkin	James Stephens	0–11	11	Oulart-the-Ballagh
3	Shane Dowling	Na Piarsaigh	2-04	10	Ballygunner
3	Shane Dowling	Na Piarsaigh	1-07	10	Crusheen
3	Liam Watson	Loughgiel Shamrocks	1–07	10	Kevin Lynch's
3	Gerry Quinn	Gort	0–10	10	Coolderry
4	Pauric Mahony	Ballygunner	1-06	9	Drom-Inch
4	Séamus Callanan	Drom-Inch	0-09	9	Ballygunner
