= 2010 Offaly Senior Hurling Championship =

Annual hurling competition season

- Sponsor: Aidan Bracken Building Design
- Champions: Coolderry (28th title); Brendan O'Meara (captain); Ken Hogan (manager)
- Runners-up: Tullamore; Jody Duffy (captain); Vinny Wyer (manager)

The 2010 Offaly Senior Hurling Championship was the 113th staging of the Offaly Senior Hurling Championship since its establishment by the Offaly County Board in 1896.

Tullamore entered the championship as the defending champions.

The final was played on 17 October 2010 at O'Connor Park in Tullamore, between Coolderry and Tullamore, in what was their eighth meeting in the final overall and a first meeting in the final in 51 years. Coolderry won the match by 3–15 to 1–12 to claim their 28th championship title overall and a first title in six years.

== Knockout stage ==
=== Relegation playoff ===
10 October 2010 Playoff	Belmont	1-10 - 0-13	Brosna Gaels	Lusmagh Grounds
	M Egan 0-9, F Daly 0-2, J Devery 0-2.		D Egan 0-7, A Egan 1-0, D Cox 0-1, P Egan 0-1, D Kenny 0-1.

17 October 2010 Playoff replay	Belmont	0-13 - 1-07	Brosna Gaels	Lusmagh Grounds
	D Cox 0-3, M Egan 0-3, D Kenny 0-2, S Nally 0-2, K McManus 0-1, J Clancy 0-1, A Egan 0-1.		D Egan 0-7, A Lynam 1-0.

=== Quarter-finals ===
18 September 2010 Quarter-final	Kilcormac–Killoughey	1-14 - 1-11	Seir Kieran	O'Connor Park
	C Slevin 0-6, J Gorman 1-2, T Fletcher 0-2, E Lee 0-1, D Currams 0-1, G Healion 0-1, C Mahon 0-1.		J Bergin 0-6, J Mulrooney 1-2, S Hynes 0-1, D Mooney 0-1, B Bergin 0-1.

18 September 2010 Quarter-final	Tullamore	0-11 - 0-10	Birr	O'Connor Park
	S Dooley 0-8, F Kerrigan 0-2, E Finnerty 0-1.		S Whelahan 0-3, G Hanniffy 0-2, S Ryan 0-2, B Lonergan 0-1, D Hayden 0-1, T Bolger 0-1.

19 September 2010 Quarter-final	Coolderry	2-18 - 0-16	Shinrone	Drumcullen Grounds
	D Murray 1-11, E Ryan 1-2, C Parlon 0-2, K Teehan 0-2, B Carroll 0-1.		M Cordial 0-12, T Hannon 0-2, S Cleary 0-1, S McKelvey 0-1.

19 September 2010 Quarter-final	Kinnitty	4-08 - 2-12	St Rynagh's	Drumcullen Grounds
	C Coughlan 3-5, F Kealey 1-0, O Kealey 0-1, J Kinsella 0-1, M McRedmond 0-1.		S Quirke 1-3, D Tanner 1-3, C Hernon 0-2, P Camon 0-1, G Scales 0-1, D Shortt 0-1, P Quirke 0-1.

=== Semi-finals ===
3 October 2010 Semi-final	Tullamore	0-13 - 0-10	Kilcormac–Killoughey	O'Connor Park
	S Dooley 0-7, K Waters 0-2, S Kelly 0-1, F Kerrigan 0-1, J Duffy 0-1, B Hogan 0-1.		T Fletcher 0-6, J Lynch 0-1, C Slevin 0-1, J Dunican 0-1, E Lee 0-1.

3 October 2010 Semi-final	Coolderry	2-23 - 0-10	Kinnitty	O'Connor Park
	D Murray 1-8, B Carroll 0-6, C Parlon 1-2, B Teehan 0-4, E Ryan 0-2, K Connolly 0-1.		C Coughlan 0-4, O Kealey 0-3, S Molloy 0-1, M McRedmond 0-1, J Kinsella 0-1.

=== Final ===
17 October 2010 Final	Coolderry	3-15 - 1-12	Tullamore	O'Connor Park
	D Murray 2-4, B Carroll 0-7, C Parlon 1-1, B Teehan 0-1, E Ryan 0-1, K Connolly 0-1.	Report	S Dooley 1-7, F Kerrigan 0-2, E Finnerty 0-1, J Duffy 0-1, S Kelly 0-1.
