= 2015 Offaly Senior Hurling Championship =

Annual hurling competition season

- Dates: 17 April – 18 October 2015
- Teams: 12
- Sponsor: Molloy Environmental Systems
- Champions: Coolderry (30th title); Brian Carroll (captain); Johnny Kelly (manager)
- Runners-up: St Rynagh's; Francis Forde (manager)
- Relegated: Brosna Gaels

Tournament statistics
- Matches played: 38

The 2015 Offaly Senior Hurling Championship was the 118th staging of the Offaly Senior Hurling Championship since its establishment by the Offaly County Board in 1896. The championship began on 17 April 2015 and ended on 18 October 2015.

Kilcormac–Killoughey were the defending champions, however, they were defeated by St Rynagh's at the semi-final stage. Shamrocks entered the championship as a promoted team.

On 18 October 2015, Coolderry won the championship following a 2–15 to 1–16 defeat of St Rynagh's in the final. This was their 30th championship title, their first in four championship seasons.

== Teams ==
All but one of the twelve teams from the 2014 championship participated in the top tier of Offaly hurling in 2015.

Shamrocks, who defeated St Rynagh's by 0-22 to 1–6 in the final of the intermediate championship in 2014, gained automatic promotion to the senior championship.

Similarly, Kinnitty defeated Drumcullen by 0–17 to 0–12 in the 2014 senior relegation play-off, and so Drumcullen were relegated to the intermediate grade for 2015.

== Results ==
=== Group 1 ===
Pos	Team	Pld	W	D	L	For	Ag.	Diff.	Pts.
1	St Rynagh's	5	5	0	0	115	59	56	10
2	Seir Kieran	5	4	0	1	101	91	10	8
3	Belmont	5	2	1	2	90	82	8	5
4	Tullamore	5	2	0	3	116	92	24	4
5	Ballinamere	5	1	1	3	93	126	-33	3
6	Shamrocks	5	0	0	5	68	133	-65	0

=== Group 2 ===
Pos	Team	Pld	W	D	L	For	Ag.	Diff.	Pts.
1	Coolderry	5	5	0	0	117	73	44	10
2	Kilcormac–Killoughey	5	4	0	1	90	66	24	8
3	Birr	5	3	0	2	131	90	41	6
4	Shinrone	5	2	0	3	99	88	11	4
5	Kinnitty	5	1	0	4	95	97	-2	2
6	Brosna Gaels	5	0	0	5	51	169	-118	0

==== Relegation play-offs ====
12 September 2015 Semi-final	Kinnitty	6-24 - 0-10	Shamrocks	St Finian's Park

13 September 2015 Semi-final	Ballinamere	w/o - scr.	Brosna Gaels

4 October 2015 Final	Shamrocks	w/o - scr.	Brosna Gaels

==== Quarter-finals ====
12 September 2015 Quarter-final	Coolderry	1-19 - 1-9	Tullamore	O'Connor Park

12 September 2015 Quarter-final	St Rynagh's	1-20 - 0-16	Shinrone	O'Connor Park

13 September 2015 Quarter-final	Belmont	1-16 - 2-17	Kilcormac–Killoughey	St Brendan's Park

13 September 2015 Quarter-final	Seir Kieran	2-13 - 1-18	Birr	St Brendan's Park

=== Semi-finals ===
4 October 2015 Semi-final	Coolderry	2-15 - 1-10	Birr	O'Connor Park

4 October 2015 Semi-final	St Rynagh's	1-22 - 1-16	Kilcormac–Killoughey	O'Connor Park

=== Final ===
18 October 2015 Final	Coolderry	2-15 - 1-16	St Rynagh's	O'Connor Park
	D Murray 0-6 (5fs); K Connolly 1-2; J Brady 1-0; B Carroll 0-3 (1f); K Brady 0-2; A Corcoran, D King 0-1 each	Report	S Wynne 0-13 (12fs); B Conneely 1-0; R Hughes, S Quirke, C Hernon 0-1 each.	Referee: D Cooke (Crinkill)
