= Coolderry =

Village in County Offaly, Ireland

Coolderry Cúl Doire
- Village
- Location in Ireland
- Coordinates: 53°00′N 7°47′W
- Country: Ireland
- Province: Leinster
- County: County Offaly
- Elevation: 88 m (289 ft)
- Time zone: UTC+0 (WET)
  - Summer (DST): UTC-1 (IST (WEST))
- Irish Grid Reference: S100959

Coolderry (Irish: Cúl Doire) is a small roadside village in southern County Offaly, Ireland. It is located 8 kilometres north of Roscrea and 11 kilometres south of Birr. The village lies close to the Slieve Bloom Mountains.

Places of note include Gloster House and Leap Castle.

== Amenities ==
Coolderry contains a number of facilities including a Roman Catholic church, Coolderry National School, a community hall and a GAA facility.

== Demographics ==
In the 2006 Census, the electoral division of Ettagh, in which Coolderry is located, had a population of 433. Coolderry village itself has a population of around 80.

== Sport ==
Coolderry is home to Coolderry GAA, the most successful hurling side in Offaly with 31 Offaly Senior Hurling Championship titles and 1 Leinster Senior Hurling Championship title.
