= Soe Win (prince) =

Burmese diplomat and prince (born 1947)

His Royal Highness Maha Chandra Kumara Soe Win
- မဟာစန္ဒြကုမာရစိုးဝင်း
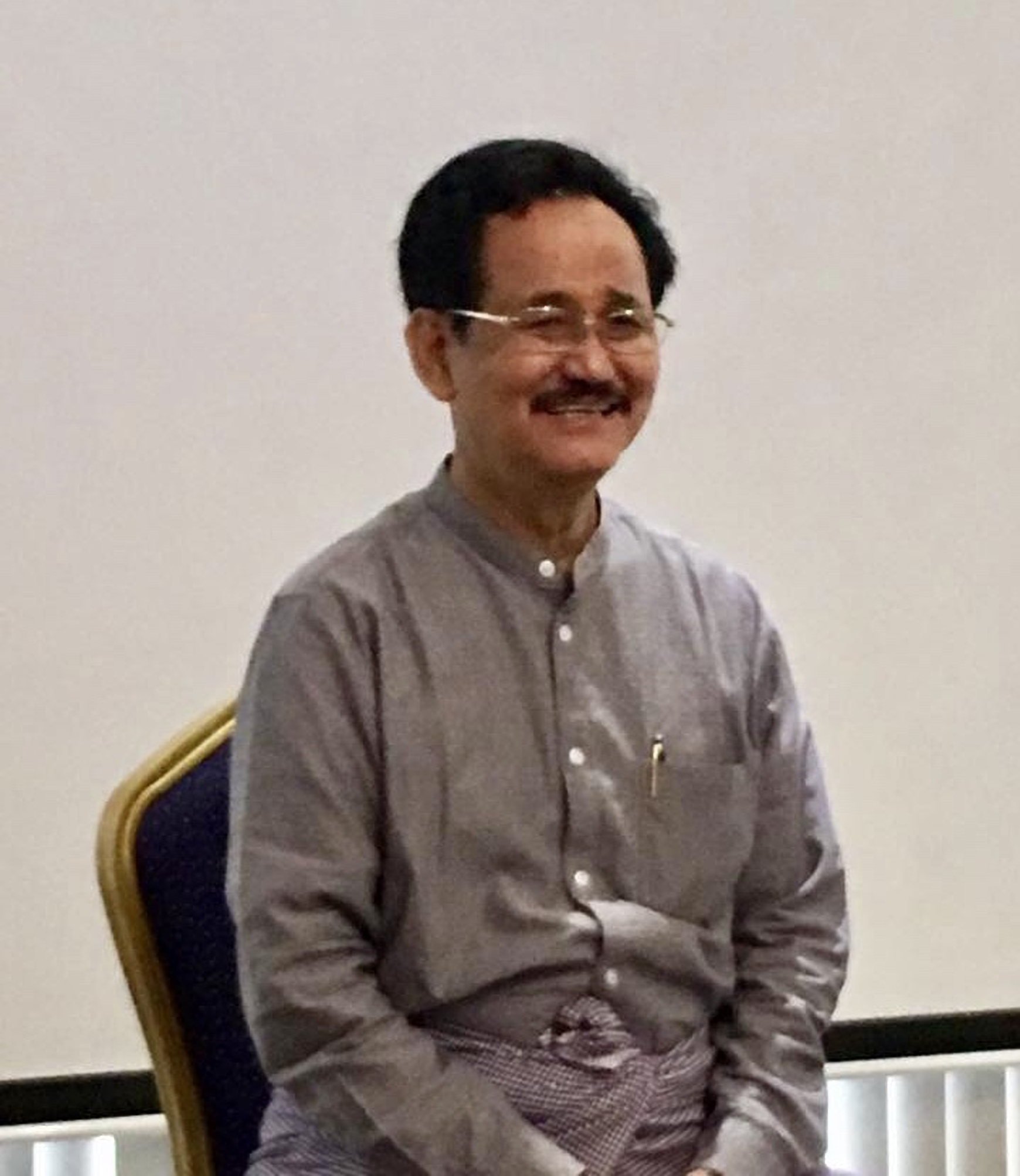
- Soe Win in 2018

Deputy director-general of Protocol Department
- In office 2006–2009
- Prime Minister: Soe Win; Thein Sein

Personal details
- Born: 15 January 1948 (age 78) Rangoon, Burma
- Spouse: Tin Lay Wai
- Children: Min Oo Soe Win; Sandi Soe Win
- Parents: Taw Phaya Gyi (father); Khin Kyi (mother)
- Relatives: Thibaw (great-grandfather); Supayalat (great-grandmother); Taw Phaya (uncle); Hteik Su Phaya Gyi (aunt); Taw Phaya Nge (uncle); Taw Phaya Galay (uncle); Hteik Su Phaya Htwe (aunt); Devi Thant Sin (cousin)
- Education: Rangoon University

Maha Chandra Kumara Soe Win (Burmese: မဟာစန္ဒြကုမာရစိုးဝင်း; born 15 January 1947) is a retired Burmese diplomat, prince and senior member of the Royal House of Konbaung as the pretender to the Throne of Burma (abolished in 1885) since 2019. He is the eldest son of Prince Taw Phaya Gyi and great-grandson of King Thibaw and Chief Queen Supayalat.

== Early life ==
Soe Win was born on 15 January 1947 in Rangoon, Burma. He is the eldest son of Prince Taw Phaya Gyi and his first wife, Khin Kyi. He graduated from Rangoon University. He is married to Tin Lay Wai and they both have a son named Min Oo and a daughter named Sandi.

== Career ==
Soe Win worked to promote a positive image of Myanmar overseas, even during the darkest periods of military rule. He joined the Burmese Foreign Service, becoming First Secretary in Washington, DC, from 1987 to 1991. He served as Ambassador extraordinary and plenipotentiary to Japan until 1999, Pakistan from 1999 to 2003, Australia from 2003 to 2005 and also served in Hong Kong and China, before retiring in 2009. Later, he joined the Myanmar Football Association to coach the national team in their unsuccessful bid to win the FIFA U-20 World Cup in New Zealand in 2015. He once managed the Myanmar national under-19 football team and was head of the International department of Myanmar Football Federation.

He served as deputy director-general of Protocol from 2006 to 2008. He also served as vice-chairman of the Myanmar-China Friendship Association.

In 2017, Soe Win requested the Thai royal family and government to stop airing the Thai historical drama Plerng Phra Nang, loosely based on Hsinbyumashin's life, claiming it insulted the Burmese royal family. Soe Win called the drama Plerng Phra Nang "unwatchable" and "distasteful" for what he deemed its insult to the Burmese royal family and asked the government for the series to be taken off the air. The producer, Chitralada Disayanon, argued that the plot was "unrelated to Burma and completely fictional, with the costumes and setting not meant to evoke any country or time period in particular".

== Documentary film ==
In 2017, Soe Win and his uncle Taw Phaya, aunt Hteik Su Phaya Gyi, cousin Devi Thant Sin appeared as the main characters of We Were Kings, a documentary film by Alex Bescoby and Max Jones. The film premiered in Mandalay on 4 November 2017 at the Irrawaddy Literary Festival and also screened in Thailand at the Foreign Correspondents' Club of Thailand. The film is about Myanmar's history, but also about the descendants of the last kings of Burma who lived unassuming lives in modern Myanmar, unrecognized and unknown.

== Mission to search for missing royal gems ==
King Thibaw was sent into exile by the British in 1885. He gave the Burmese Crown Jewels, including a giant ruby, to colonel Edward Bosc Sladen for safekeeping but they were never returned. His descendant believes that recovering the long lost royal treasure would restore pride in his nation. Soe Win has been investigating the royal ruby's disappearance with Alex Bescoby, a filmmaker and historian.

On 3 November 2017, he arrived in London in a bid to find the precious giant royal ruby "Nga Mauk" which is said to be the size of a duck egg that was reportedly stolen by a British colonel over 130 years ago. That giant ruby alleged to have been stolen from the Burmese royal family by a British officer Edward Bosc Sladen who took it back to England. He believes that the Nga Mauk ruby was subsequently used by the British royal family in its crown jewels.

Soe Win (prince) Konbaung dynasty Born: 15 January 1948
Royal titles
| Preceded by Taw Phaya | Heir to the Burmese Throne; 2019 – present | Incumbent |
