= Devi Thant Sin =

H.R.H Princess Devi Thant Sin
- ဒေါ်‌ေဒဝီသန့်စင်
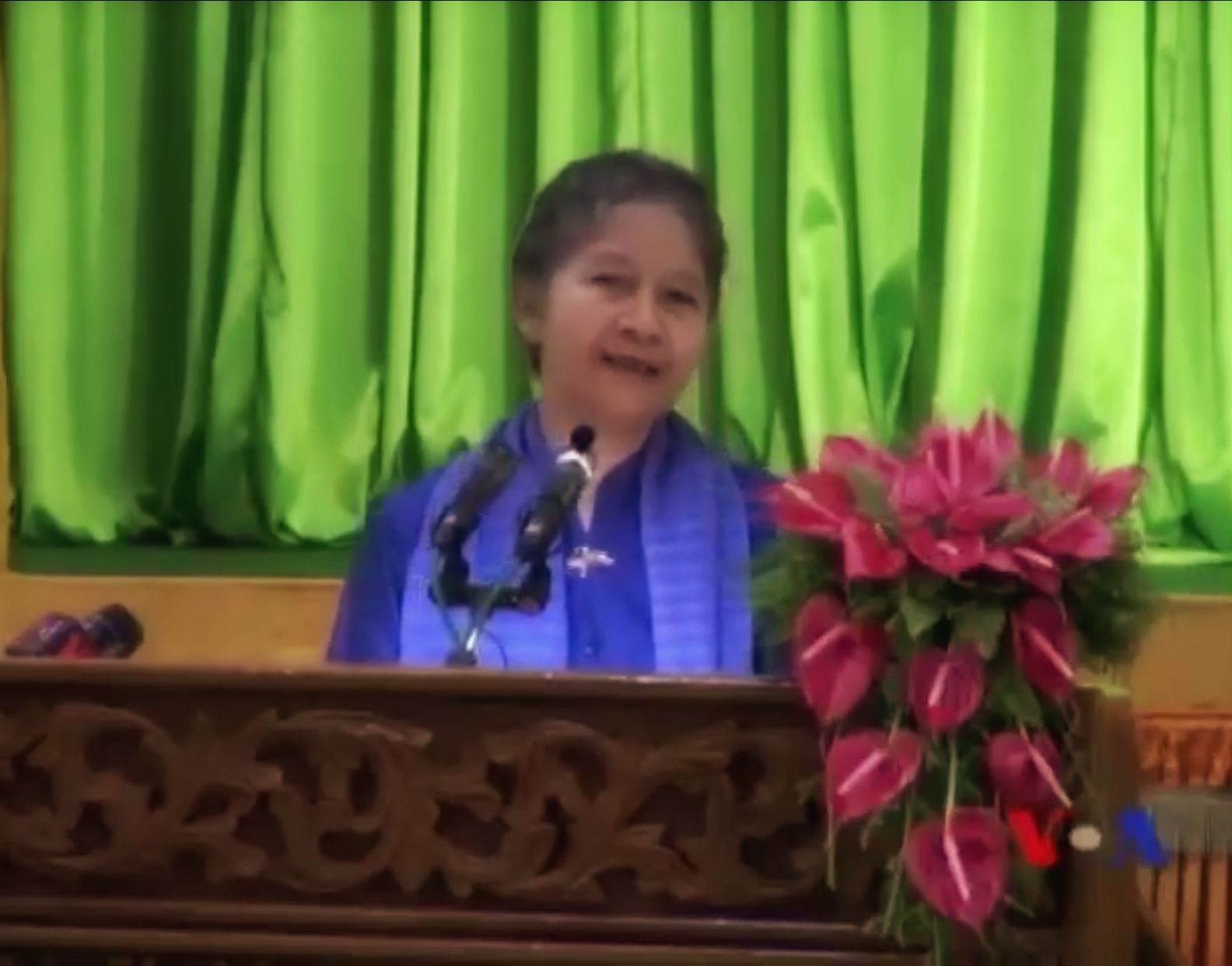
- Devi Thant Sin in 2016
- Born: 2 January 1947 (age 79); Rangoon, British Burma (now Yangon)
- Occupations: Environmentalist; Writer; Politician
- Known for: Environmental activism
- Spouse: Aye Ko
- Parent(s): Taw Phaya Galay; Khin May

Devi Thant Sin (Burmese: ဒေဝီသန့်စင်, also spelt Devi Thant Cin; born 2 January 1947) is a Burmese environmentalist, writer, and senior member of the Royal House of Konbaung. She is the leader of the environmental movement in Myanmar and has been called a "green princess". She was seriously opposed to the Myitsone Dam project slated for construction at the confluence of two rivers that gives rise to the Irrawaddy River.

She is the founder of the environmental activist organizations Global Green Group (3G) and the Myanmar Green Network.

== Background ==
Devi Thant Sin was born on 2 January 1947 in Yangon, British Burma to Prince Taw Phaya Galay and his wife Khin May. She is not only known for being a leading environmentalist, but also as a Burmese princess and direct descendant of Myanmar's last monarchs, King Thibaw and Queen Supayalat.

== Career and activism ==
Considered one of Myanmar's first environmentalists, Devi Thant Sin opposes deforestation and other causes of environmental destruction in her Southeast Asian nation. Despite her family's loss of royal status, she still considers it her duty to look after the interests of the Burmese people.

After writing about environmental awareness for other publications in the early 2000s, she launched her own magazine, Aung Pin Lae, Myanmar's first and only Burmese-language environmental magazine, in 2007. Her goal was to inform the Burmese public of the global green movement and of local environmental damage. She also began travelling the country, educating farmers on the risk of using chemical fertilizers and speaking with students about environmental concerns. She helped to unify Myanmar's burgeoning green movement.

In 2006 she gathered the country's handful of environmental activists to form the Global Green Group (3G). The group is made up of shifting numbers of mining engineers, meteorologists, lawyers, civil engineers, activists, researchers and journalists. This was followed closely by her founding of the Myanmar Green Network.

Devi Thant Sin was against the controversial Chinese-backed Myitsone Dam project. It was slated for construction at the confluence of two rivers that gives rise to the Irrawaddy River, Myanmar's most important waterway; she stated that any disruption to the water flow would, among other things, worsen the environmental damage already being inflicted on the country. She said,

"For the whole of Myanmar, the Irrawaddy is like the mother river. If there is dam construction that they shouldn't do, we point out that it's not the time to do it."

The environmental campaigns against the dam led to a nationwide public outcry, prompting President Thein Sein to suspend the project from 2011 until his presidential term expired in 2016. The project remains on hold.

== Documentary film ==
In 2017, Devi Thant Sin and her uncle Taw Phaya, aunt Hteik Su Phaya Gyi, and cousin Soe Win appeared in We Were Kings, a documentary film by Alex Bescoby and Max Jones. The film premiered in Mandalay on 4 November 2017 at the Irrawaddy Literary Festival and was also screened in Thailand at the Foreign Correspondents' Club of Thailand. The film is about Myanmar's history, but also about the descendants of the last kings of Burma, who have lived and continue to live unassuming lives in modern Myanmar, unrecognized and unknown.
