= Alex Bescoby =

English documentary film maker

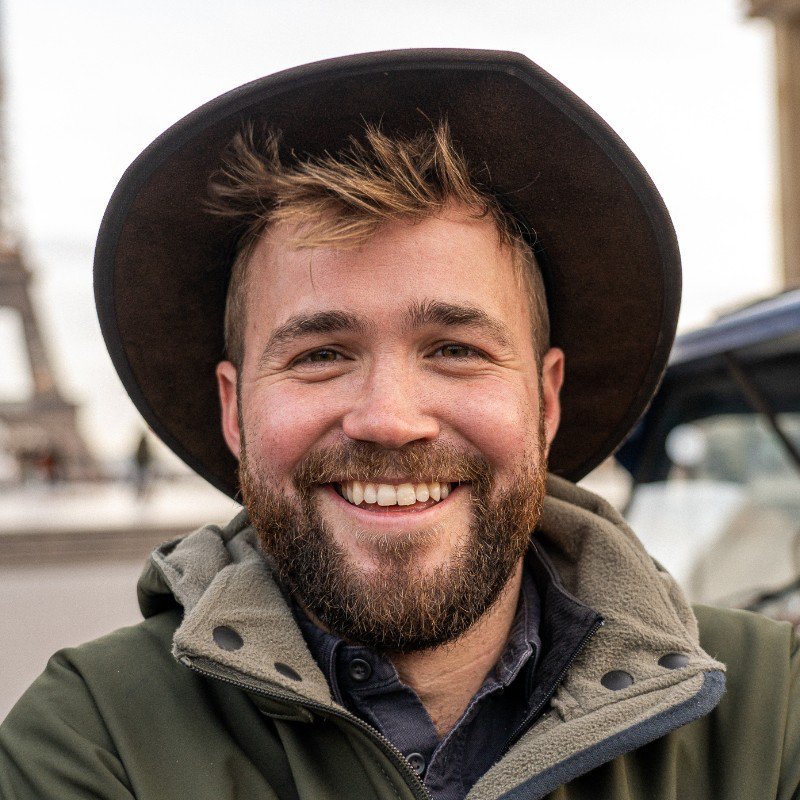
- Born: England
- Spouse: Emma Fox (m. 2024)
- Awards: Fellow Royal Geographical Society

Alex Bescoby is an English documentary filmmaker, author and television presenter.

== Early life and career ==
Born in Manchester, Bescoby attended Altrincham Grammar School for Boys in Greater Manchester from 1999 to 2006. In 2010, he graduated from Sidney Sussex College at Cambridge University, where he specialised in the history of Myanmar (Burma).

In 2013, he moved to Myanmar to work with the Myanmar Centre for Responsible Business headed by former British Ambassador Vicky Bowman, and to research a book on Myanmar's colonial experience. One episode that gripped his imagination was the last few days of the reign of King Thibaw, the last King of Burma, whose rule was ended in 1885 by the British annexation of Burma.

He tracked down Thibaw's living descendants still living in Myanmar - Prince Taw Phaya, Princess Hteik Su Phaya Gyi, U Soe Win and Daw Devi Thant Cin - and their story became his first documentary: We Were Kings. At the 2016 Sheffield DocFest, the film won the Whicker's World Foundation's inaugural TV Funding Award in 2016, a documentary grant funded from the estate of the British journalist and broadcaster Alan Whicker. It later premiered at the British Library in 2017, and was broadcast internationally the same year on History. In 2017, alongside U Soe Win - the heir to Thibaw's throne - he made a short film for BBC News - Who Stole Burma's Royal Ruby? It tells the story of what happened to Thibaw's famed Nga Mauk ruby the night he was taken into exile.

In 2017, while still living in Myanmar, Bescoby began work on his second documentary, Forgotten Allies. It told the story of a small British charity - Help for Forgotten Allies - and their efforts to locate the last surviving Myanmar veterans of the Second World War who had volunteered to fight for Britain and its allies against the Imperial Japanese. The film was supported by Dame Joanna Lumley, Dame Vera Lynn, Griff Rhys Jones, the Royal British Legion, Help for Heroes and the Burma Star Association, and premiered in 2019 at the National Army Museum in London.

In 2019, Bescoby began work on his first Channel 4 (UK) documentary series - The Last Overland: Singapore to London. It tells the story of his recreation of the 1955 Oxford & Cambridge Far Eastern Expedition in the same Series One Land Rover, alongside original crew member Tim Slessor. In 2022, Bescoby released his book about the expedition - also called The Last Overland - which was later shortlisted for the 2023 Edward Stanford Travel Writing Award and the 2023 Royal Automobile Club Book of the Year.
