= Taw Phaya Gyi =

Burmese prince

Prince George Taw Phaya Gyi
- တော်ဘုရားကြီး
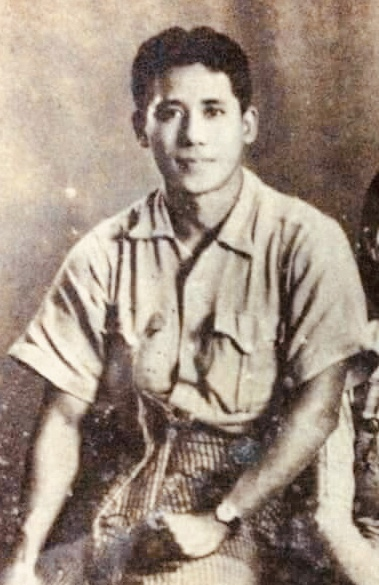
- Born: 6 May 1922; Rangoon, British Burma
- Died: 9 April 1948 (aged 25); Tatkon, Tatkon Township, Naypyidaw Union Territory, Burma
- Cause of death: Assassinated
- Education: Rangoon University (BA)
- Known for: Heir to the Throne of Burma
- Spouse: Khin Kyi (m. 1945)
- Children: Soe Win; Myo Naing
- Parent(s): Ko Ko Naing; Myat Phaya Galay
- Relatives: Thibaw (grandfather); Supayalat (grandmother); Taw Phaya (younger brother); Hteik Su Phaya Gyi (sister); Taw Phaya Nge (younger brother); Taw Phaya Galay (younger brother); Hteik Su Phaya Htwe (younger sister)

Prince George Taw Phaya Gyi (Burmese: တော်ဘုရားကြီး; 6 May 1922 – 9 April 1948) was a Burmese prince and heir to the defunct throne of Burma (abolished in 1885). He was the eldest son of Princess Myat Phaya Galay and the grandson of King Thibaw and Queen Supayalat. During the Japanese occupation, the Japanese government sought to set up Burma as a puppet kingdom within its empire with him as its puppet ruler.

== Biography ==
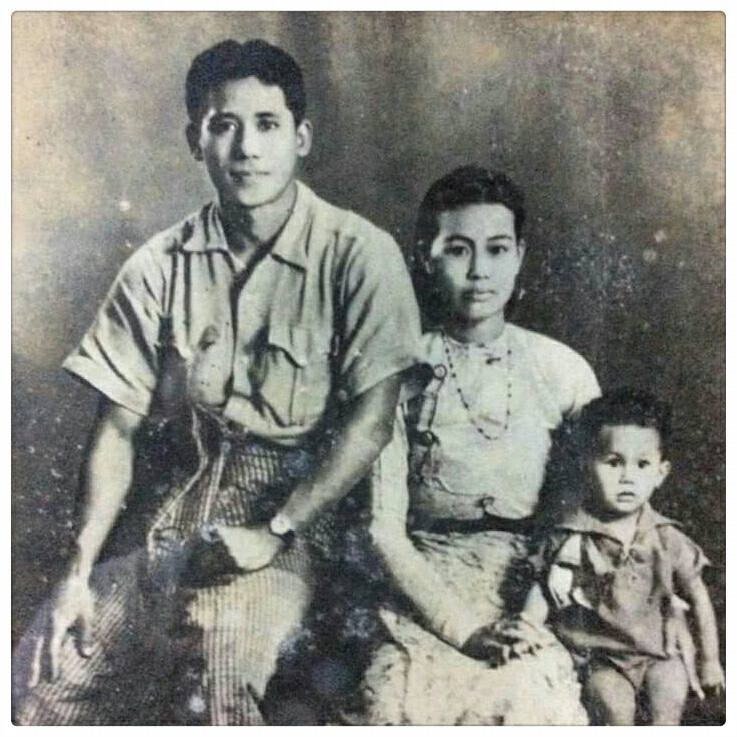
Taw Phaya Gyi, his wife Khin Kyi and son Soe Win

Taw Phaya Gyi was born on 6 May 1922 in Rangoon, British Burma to Ko Ko Naing, a former monk and Princess Myat Phaya Galay, who was the fourth daughter of King Thibaw and Chief Queen Supayalat. He studied at St Patrick’s High School Moulmein, St Paul’s School in Rangoon and graduated with a baccalaureate from Rangoon University in 1945.

Both the British and Japanese considered Taw Phaya Gyi as crown prince. His mother Myat Phaya Galay had been handed over the defunct throne of Burma with a contract while her mother Supayalat was still alive, meaning her eldest son was considered heir to the throne.

=== Puppet king and post-war ===
During the Japanese occupation, the Japanese government retained Burma within its empire but hoped to make Taw Phaya Gyi the country's puppet ruler, putting him under military guard and plotting to assassinate Burma's prime minister Ba Maw. Taken to Bangkok as the war worsened for the Japanese, he was summoned back at the war's end by the Thai government and Britain. Before leaving Bangkok, Taw Phaya Gyi signed a decree as the 12th King of Konbaung to release Burmese prisoners held in Moulmein by the Japanese.

After the war, he and his younger sister Princess Hteik Su Phaya Htwe opened a gymnasium. After Burma gained independence, he served as Petrol Rationing Officer with the Department of Civil Supplies. In April 1948, on his way to Maymyo on a business trip, he was assassinated at Tatkon in Central Burma by Communist insurgents, who mistook him for a police officer.

== Family ==
In 1945 he married his first wife Khin Kyi in Rangoon - she was Ba Maw's niece and later became the first Burmese woman to earn a master's degree in sports. He had a son, Soe Win with her in 1947, whilst another son, Myo Naing, was born to his second marriage in 1948.

== See also ==
- Konbaung dynasty
