= Taw Phaya Galay =

Prince Taw Phaya Galay
- တော်ဘုရားကလေး အောင်ဇေ
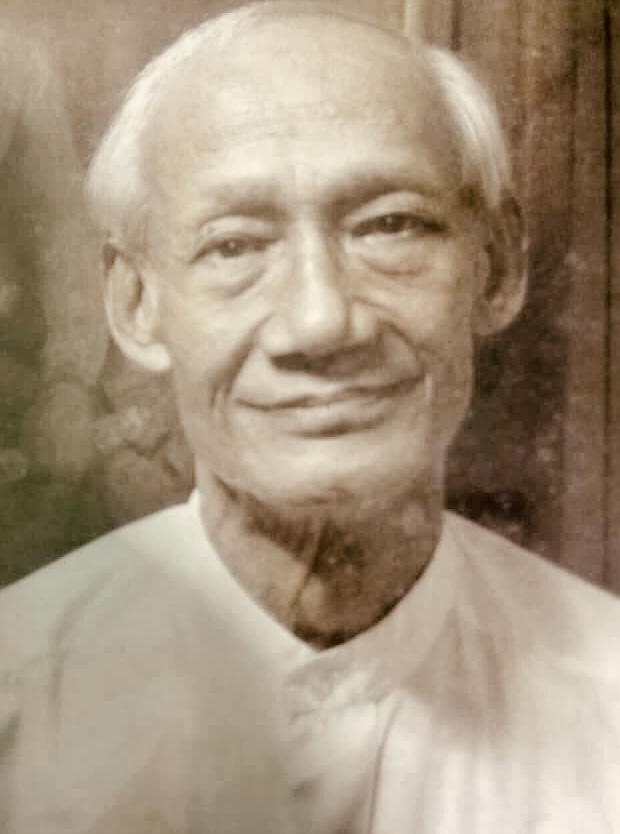
- Born: 30 July 1926; Rangoon, British Burma
- Died: 18 June 2006 (aged 79); Yangon, Myanmar
- Occupations: Businessman; politician; historian
- Spouse: Khin May
- Children: Devi Thant Sin
- Parent(s): Ko Ko Naing; Myat Phaya Galay
- Relatives: Thibaw (grandfather); Supayalat (grandmother); Taw Phaya Gyi (brother); Hteik Su Phaya Gyi (sister); Taw Phaya (brother); Taw Phaya Nge (brother); Hteik Su Phaya Htwe (sister)

Prince Taw Phaya Galay Aung Zay (Burmese: တော်ဘုရားကလေး အောင်ဇေ [tɔ̀pʰəjá ɡəlé àʊɰ̃ zè]; 30 July 1926 – 18 June 2006) was a Burmese prince, businessman and politician. He was one of the senior members of the Royal House of Konbaung and the grandson of King Thibaw and Queen Supayalat.

Taw Phaya Glay was also known as a historian for writing books about the descendants of King Thibaw and writing a manifesto demanding that the British return the royal gems and jewellery taken on the annexation of the country.

== Early life and education ==
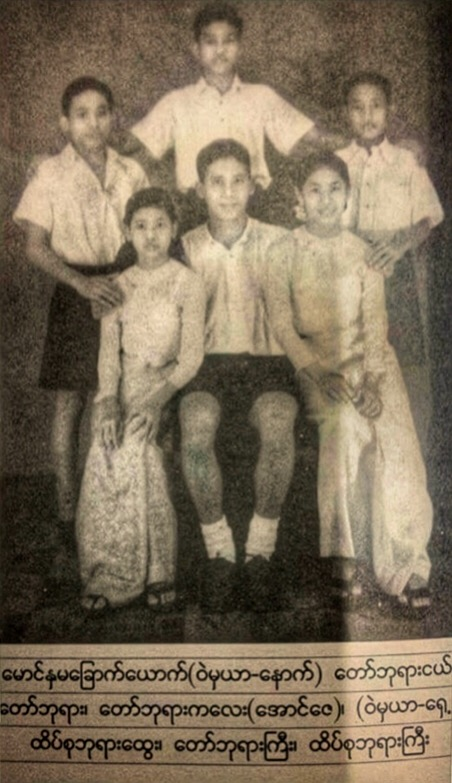
Six siblings of Taw Phaya Galay

Taw Phaya Galay was born on 30 July 1926 in Rangoon, British Burma, to Ko Ko Naing, a former monk and Princess Myat Phaya Galay who was the fourth daughter of King Thibaw and Chief Queen Supayalat. He attended St Patrick School in Moulmein and later moved to St Paul School in Yangon. Later, he left St Paul to attend the famous national school Myoma Kyaung. He failed his 1946 matriculation examination. He later took as his name U Thant Zin although royal family members did not use the U and Daw prefixes. He and his siblings were under the supervision of the British government and could not travel freely. Taw Paya Galay's three brothers were well known and much admired for their efforts to foster sports and culture through youth clubs during the Japanese occupation during World War II.

== Business career ==
In 1948, he established and served as a director of the Thibaw Commercial Syndicate, one of the few at the time that were truly owned by the Myanmar, for most companies were owned by Indian entrepreneurs with Myanmar citizens as a front. By the late 1950s the Thibaw Commercial Syndicate Ltd was exporting lacquer sap to Japan and imperial Jade to Hong Kong, with branch offices in each of those places. He often flew to Tokyo and Hong Kong to oversee sales, and by the early 1960s his business was booming, with export contracts in rice worth K30 million. In 1950s, he established the Union of Burma Exporters Oriental Corporation also becoming its director. Between 1955 and 1957, he served as an organizer at the Headquarters, Trade Union Congress (Burma) (TUCB). However, General Ne Win took power in Burma in a coup d’état, and Taw Paya Galay's company, along with all others, was nationalised.

== Political movement ==
Taw Paya Galay and his brothers actively supported Thakin Kodaw Hmaing, the revered "father of nationalism". He became an active member of the underground resistance before and during WWII, first against the British and then the Japanese. Between 1957 and 1960, he served as Central Executive Committee Member of the Internal Peace League, the World Peace Congress (Burma), and the Asia-Africa Consolidation Organization as treasurer, and for the National Committee against Kuomintang Invasion and Imperialism. In 1961, he worked for the China-Myanmar Friendship Association, and the Korea-Myanmar Friendship Association.

In 1964, he was the administration manager at MIEc headquarters but resigned the following year by force because of his moral character. The president of the Chinese-Myanmar Friendship Association was arrested in 1966, just before riots broke out against the Chinese community in Burma. Taw Paya Galay went underground for nearly two years until he was caught and sent to Insein Prison, where he remained until 1970.

During the countrywide uprising against the socialist regime in 1988, he became a patron of a powerful political assembly known "A Myo Thar Naing Ngan Yay Tat Paung Su" (Ma-Ma-Ta National Political Front). As a result, he was sent back to Insein Prison in 1989 at the age of 63, and was released in 1992.

== Personal life ==
In 1945, he married Khin May. Their only child Devi Thant Sin is a prominent environmentalist.
