= Oxford and Cambridge Expedition to South America =

The Oxford and Cambridge Expedition to South America took place in 1957-8, when teams from Oxford and Cambridge Universities drove overland across South America in three Land Rovers.

The expedition was the third in a series of overland expeditions undertaken by a joint team from both universities. The first, in 1954, was the Oxford and Cambridge Trans-Africa Expedition, from London to Cape Town, and the second and most famous was the 1955-6 Oxford and Cambridge Far Eastern Expedition, from London to Singapore.

While on the expedition team member Adrian Cowell met the Villas-Bôas brothers and left the Oxford and Cambridge Expedition to join them on the Centro Geographico Expedition to find the geographical centre of Brazil.

Ethnographic items collected were donated to the Pitt Rivers Museum in Oxford by Peter Rivière on behalf of the expedition.

== Team members (partial list) ==
- Adrian Cowell (Cambridge) (previously a participant on the 1955-6 Singapore expedition)
- John Moore (Cameraman)
- Nigel Newbery (Oxford) (previously a participant on the 1955-6 Singapore expedition)
- Peter Rivière
