= Hteik Su Phaya Htwe =

Burmese athlete (1927–2003)

Princess Margret Hteik Su Phaya Htwe
- ထိပ်စုဖုရားထွေး
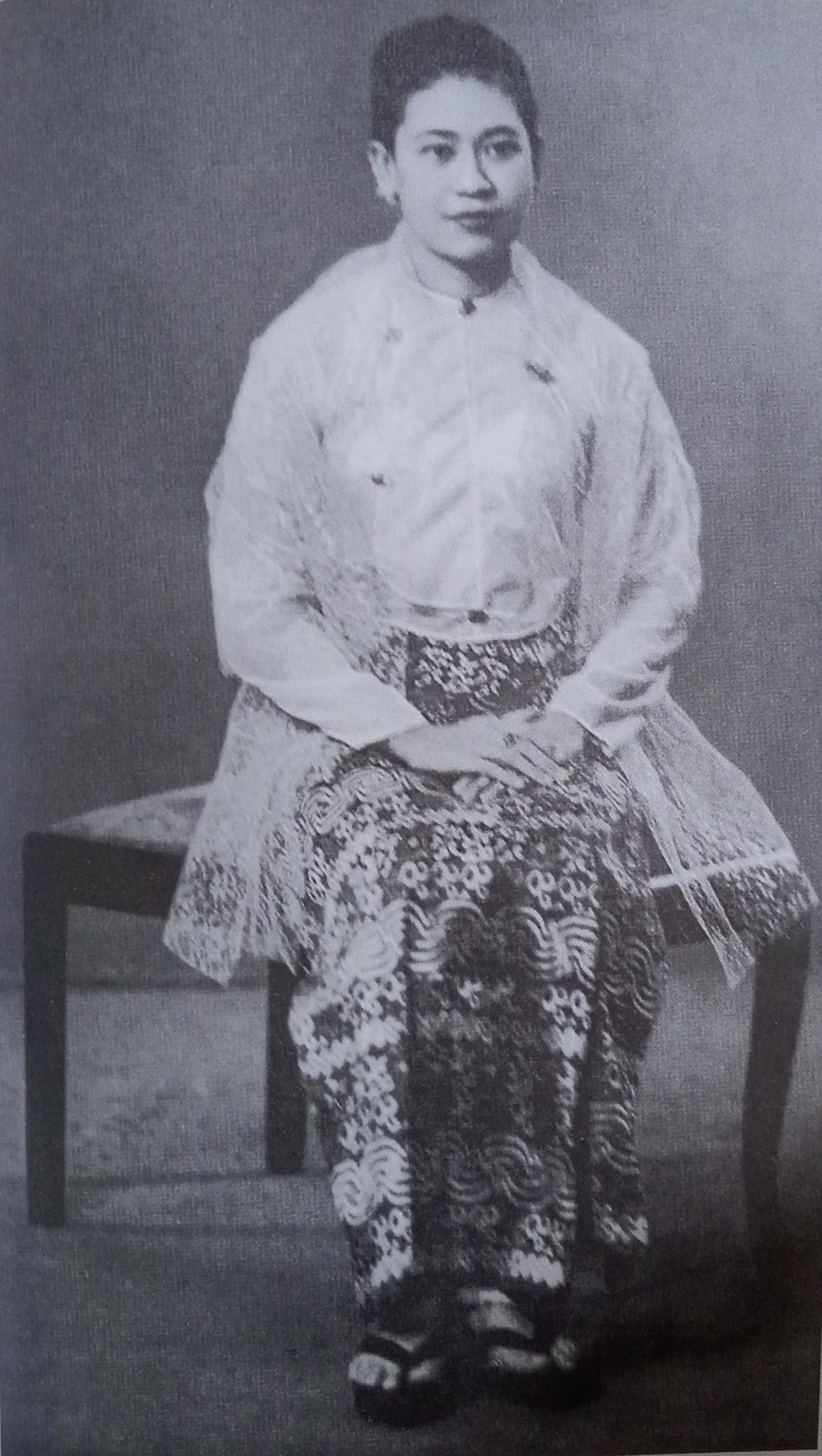
- Born: Hteik Su Phaya Htwe; 20 August 1927; Rangoon, Burma, British Raj
- Died: 21 June 2003 (aged 75); Rangoon, Myanmar
- Occupations: Athlete, bodybuilder, swimmer
- Known for: A pioneer in Burmese sports
- Spouse: Taw Phaya Myat Gyi (m. 1962)
- Children: Aung Naing
- Parent(s): Ko Ko Naing; Myat Phaya Galay

Princess Margret Hteik Su Phaya Htwe (Burmese: ထိပ်စုဖုရားထွေး; 20 August 1927 – 21 June 2003) was a pioneer Burmese athlete, bodybuilder, swimmer and a former beauty queen. She was the youngest daughter of Princess Myat Phaya Galay, the fourth daughter of the last king of Burma Thibaw Min and Supayalat.

== Early life and education ==
Hteik Su Phaya Htwe was born on 20 August 1927 in Rangoon, British Burma; her father was Ko Ko Naing, a former monk and her mother was Princess Myat Phaya Galay, the fourth daughter of King Thibaw and Queen Supayalat. She attended the St. Joseph Convent in Moulmein and Myoma Girls National High School in Rangoon.

== Career ==
After the war, she and her older brother Prince Taw Phaya Gyi opened a gymnasium. In 1946, she was selected in Burma national team for swimming competition. In 1947, she finished as the second in the Burma's first Miss Burma competition. After retirement from sports, she served as the administrator of the National Stadium and as the organizer of the Yangon Division National Fitness Council of the Ministry of Health. She also served as the chief athlete officer for Rangoon Division.

== Personal life ==
In 1962, she married her nephew Taw Phaya Myat Gyi, eldest son of Taw Phaya and Hteik Su Gyi Phaya. They had a son, Aung Naing. She died on 21 June 2003 at the age of 75.
