= Adrian Cowell =

British filmmaker

- portrait of Adrian Cowell
- Born: 2 February 1934 (age 91); Tianjin, China
- Occupations: Film director; film producer; screenwriter
- Years active: 1960–2002
- Spouse: Pilly Chamberlayne (m. 1960–2008)

John Adrian Cowell (2 February 1934 – 11 October 2011) was a British filmmaker, born in northern China, in or near Tianjin. He was best known for producing documentaries about Chico Mendes and deforestation in the Amazon and the opium/heroin trade out of the Shan States, Burma (Myanmar).

Cowell was educated at Ampleforth College and St Catharine's College, Cambridge, where he studied history. While a student at Cambridge, he planned (but was unable to take part in) the 1954 Oxford and Cambridge Trans-Africa Expedition, and took part in the 1955-6 Oxford and Cambridge Far Eastern Expedition to Singapore and the 1957-8 Oxford and Cambridge Expedition to South America. It was on the latter expedition team that Cowell met the Villas-Bôas brothers and left the Oxford and Cambridge Expedition to join them on the Centro Geographico Expedition to find the geographical centre of Brazil. This was the beginning of his connection with South America and, in particular, Brazil.

Cowell was awarded the Royal Geographical Society's Cherry Kearton Medal and Award in 1985, and in 1991 won the Founders Award at the International Emmys. In his obituary in The Guardian, Anthony Hayward wrote that he was "one of the most successful" documentary makers of his generation. His documentaries about the rain forest brought the subject significant political attention.

== Family ==
Cowell married Pilly Chamberlayne in 1960; they divorced in 2008. Their union produced a daughter, Boojie, and a son, Xingu. Cowell formed an extramarital relationship with Barbara Bramble in 1987. Xingu Cowell died in a canoeing accident in 1986.

== Works ==
- The Heart of the Forest, 1960
- Carnival of Violence, in 3 parts: 1960, 1962, 1966
- Raid into Tibet, 1966
- The Unknown War, 1966
- The Opium Trail, 1966
- The Tribe That Hides from Man, 1970
- The Kingdom in the Jungle, 1971
- The Opium Warlords, 1974
- Opium, 1978
- The Ashes of the Forest, 1984
- Banking On Disaster, 1987
- The Crusade for the Forest, 1990
- Cowell, Adrian (1991). Decade of Destruction: The Crusade to Save the Amazon Rain Forest. Anchor Books. ISBN 978-0-385-42032-7.
- The Heroin Wars, 1996
- Cowell, Adrian (1997). The Opium Kings. PBS Frontline.
- The Last of the Hiding Tribes, 1999
- Fires of the Amazon, 2002
