= Peter Rivière =

British social anthropologist

Peter G. Rivière
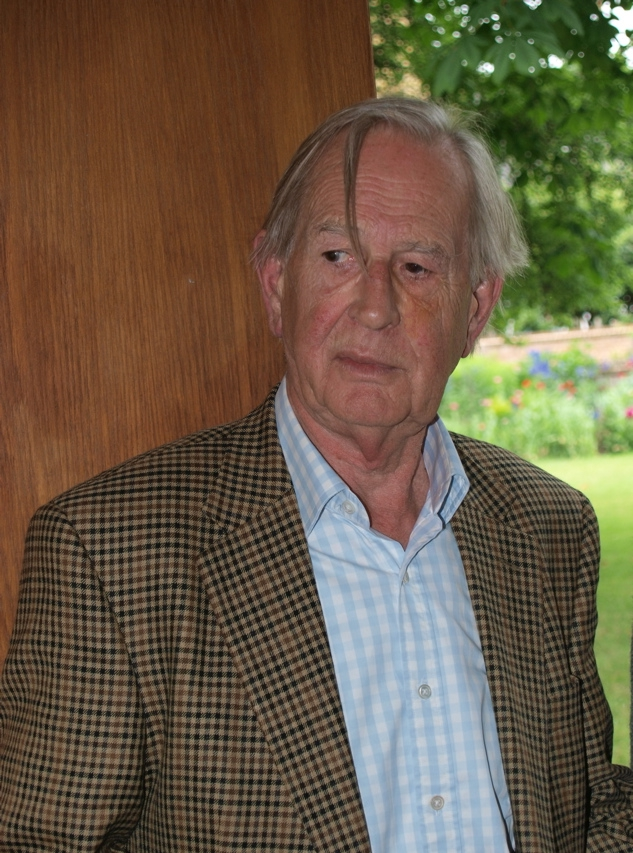
- Peter Rivière
- Born: January 17th 1934
- Education: University of Oxford
- Occupations: social anthropologist, Emeritus Professor of Oxford University
- Known for: Study of Amazonian peoples in England

Peter G. Rivière (born 1934) is a British social anthropologist, emeritus Professor of Oxford University and, with Audrey Butt Colson, a pioneer in the study and teaching of Amazonian peoples in England. In 1957-8 he took part in the Oxford and Cambridge Expedition to South America.

== Education and career ==
He completed a D.Phil in Social Anthropology at Oxford in 1965, and taught there from 1971 until his retirement, in 2001. He was part of young generation of anthropologists who set new, professional standards of ethnography in Amazonia. He conducted extensive fieldwork among the Tiriyo of Surinam and among cattle ranchers of the Brazilian frontier.

His book, Individual and Society in Guiana, today considered a classic of modern Amerindian anthropology, was regarded as "the most elegant summary and review of the central findings and debates in the ethnography of the Amerindian peoples of Guiana over the last three decades."

In 2001, a group of his former students, today well established scholars in several major universities, edited a book celebrating his contributions to the field, where they underscored that:

"[His] commitment to and interest in the particularities of Amazonian social processes, is not an abstract interest in the 'particular', understood as a theoretical commitment in the manner of the Boasians. Rather, the particular is important as a means to connect theory, methodology, and context. Lowland South American groups are not bearers of distinctive traits to be inventoried and classified, but organized totalities responding to specific social rules, laws, and constraints. Interest in the particular, therefore, results from an appreciation of the necessity of accurate scholarship, no less than brave new worlds of theory, as Rivière's work on the dialectical relationship between cosmological schemas and forms of social organization demonstrates."

In recent years, his work has turned more historical. He edited reprints of the Victorian classics by John McLennan and John Lubbock for the University of Chicago and a collection on the history of Oxford anthropology (2007, 2009). He also published a book on the frontier dispute between Great Britain and Brazil, and edited two volumes of Robert Schomburgk's Guiana travels in 1835-44 for the Hakluyt Society.
