= Tim Slessor =

British filmmaker (1931–2026)

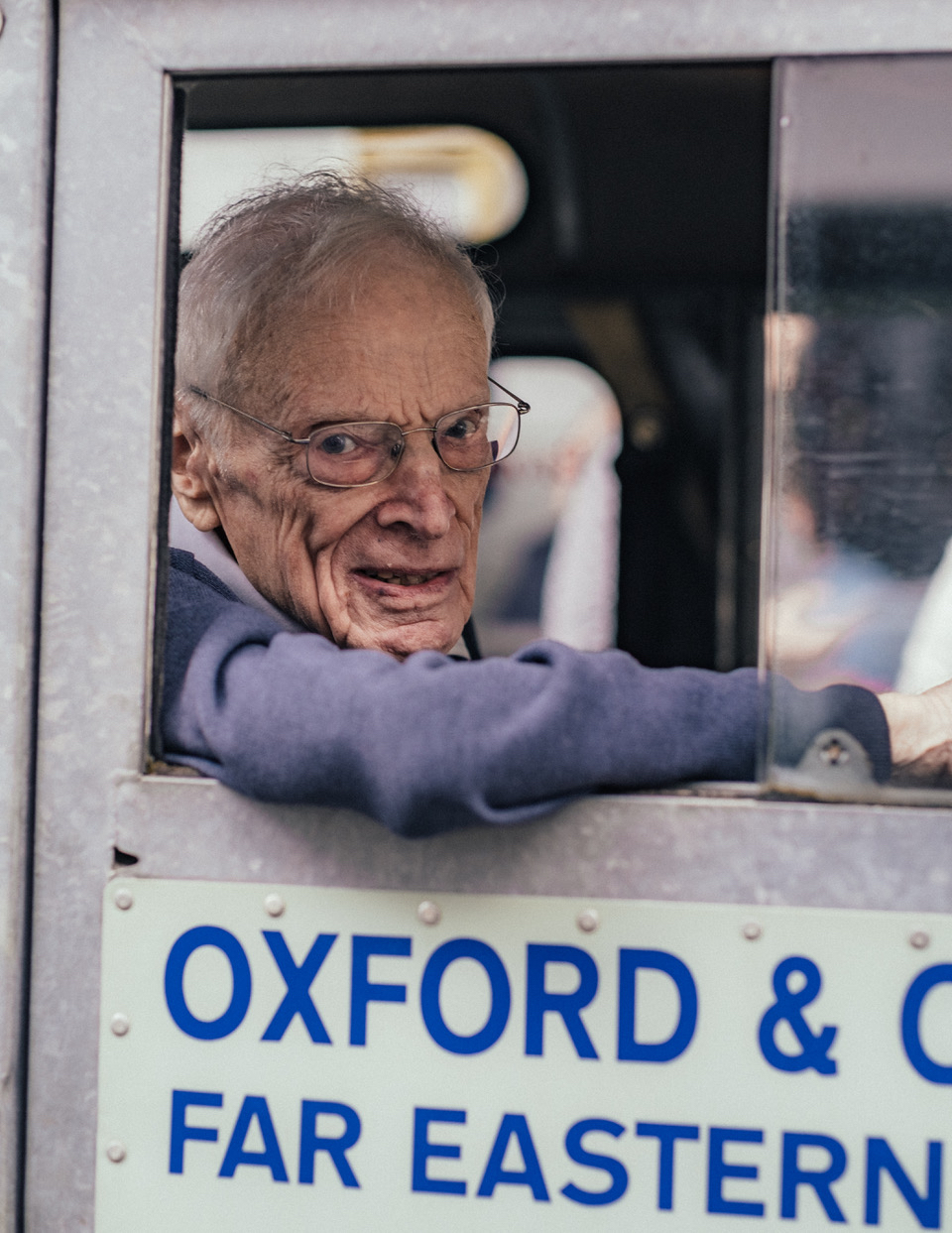
- Slessor in 2019
- Born: Timothy Paul Slessor; 1 October 1931; Gosport, Hampshire, England
- Died: 5 April 2026 (aged 94)
- Awards: Peabody Award; Western Heritage Award

Timothy Paul Slessor (1 October 1931 – 5 April 2026) was a British filmmaker, presenter, traveller and author. He is best known as the scribe and assistant cameraman for the 1955–1956 Oxford and Cambridge Far Eastern Expedition from London to Singapore. Graduating from Cambridge University with a degree in geography, he joined the BBC in 1957 and for more than 30 years worked with the BBC making documentaries all over the world, receiving a Peabody award.

Slessor ended his BBC career as deputy head of its features documentary department and subsequently turned to freelance work – writing for various magazines and producing for National Geographic.

His filmography includes, as Producer and Director, "Australia", "Looking at Britain", and "Looking at the United States".

At the age of 87, Slessor and others in one of the original Land Rovers, re-created the first London to Singapore trip by doing it in reverse; they started from Singapore on 25 August 2019 on a trip called the Last Overland.

== Life and career ==
=== Early life and education ===
Tim Slessor was born in Gosport, Hampshire, England on 1 October 1931. His father was an officer in the Royal Navy's Fleet Air Arm; consequently Slessor spent most of his pre-war boyhood in Malta, the then home base of the RN's Mediterranean fleet. But in June 1940, when his father (along with over 1,500 others) was lost in the sinking of the carrier Glorious and her two escorting destroyers, his mother took him back to her home country of Australia. In late 1945, with the War over, he and his mother eventually returned to the United Kingdom.

He attended Cambridge University in 1952, and graduated in 1955 with a degree in geography.

=== Military ===
At 18, after completing secondary education at Malvern College in Worcestershire, Tim chose to do his military service in the Navy, specifically in the Royal Marines Commandos. After a year he was commissioned as a Lieutenant, and then posted to an active service unit in Malaya, fighting communist insurgents.

=== Oxford and Cambridge Far Eastern Expedition ===
During his last year at Cambridge, he and a friend put together a six-man expedition: they aimed to become the first people to drive all-the-way-overland (in two early Land Rovers) from Europe to Singapore. A number of people had already tried – and failed. From 1955 to 1956 after a long and difficult journey of 12,000 miles, the Cambridge crew succeeded. Their films were later shown on both the BBC-TV and NBC. And Tim's book, First Overland, is still, after 63 years, in print.

=== BBC, PBS, and Nebraska ===
In 1957, he joined the BBC as a documentary trainee. In subsequent years, as he became more experienced (and a presenter/director) he travelled the world and won several awards both in the U.K. and U.S., including a citation from the National Cowboy & Western Heritage Museum in Oklahoma for a five-part series on the American West. In 1965 he quit the BBC. and migrated with his wife and their two small children to Chadron, Nebraska. He taught English and journalism. Later, the family moved east to Syracuse, New York where, for two years, he worked for the local PBS station (WCNY-TV). The family returned to the United Kingdom. Tim went back to the BBC where he joined a team making a 13-part documentary series about the U.K. – shot entirely from a helicopter. Later he made the BBC's five-part tribute to Australia on the occasion of that country's bicentenary (1788–1988). He also became a specialist on documentaries about the United States. Amongst many other assignments in those parts, he worked on Alistair Cooke's 13-part NBC/BBC series about the history of the US. He eventually wound up in a largely administrative/executive role as the number two in the BBC's general documentary department. He retired in 1990.

=== After the BBC ===
Slessor retired from the BBC in 1990, and produced more documentaries—filming from the Himalayas to the Arctic, and Australia to Africa. Since then, he has written two more books. The first, Lying in State, is a heavily researched polemic questioning Britain's Ministry of Defense for a series of nine “official” cover-ups and deceptions – ranging, for example, from the 20-year denial of Gulf War Syndrome to the true circumstances behind the loss of his father's ship back in 1940. His other book, Out West, continues his fascination with the many-veined story of the American West.

He periodically travelled back to Nebraska and Wyoming.

=== The Last Overland ===
In 2017, Slessor, his grandson Nat George, Alex Bescoby, Leo Belanger, David Israeli, Therese-Marie Becker, Larry Leong, Silverius Purba and Marcus Allender planned a reverse trip of the original 1955–1956 expedition. Tim Slessor was originally planning to drive, but on the first day of the trip he developed medical issues and was not able to proceed. On 25 August 2019, the team and three Land Rovers, including one of the original vehicles (named by the first expedition the "Oxford") set off from Singapore to London. On 14 December 2019, after 111 days, the team made it to London.

=== Death ===
Slessor died on 5 April 2026, at the age of 94.

== Bibliography ==
1. Slessor, Tim (2015). First Overland: London-Singapore by Land Rover (2nd ed.). Signal Books. p. 256. ISBN 978-1909930360. First published 1957 by George Harrap &Co., Ltd. Foreword by David Attenborough
2. Slessor, Tim (2016). Out West: An Englishman's Travels through the American West. Oxford: Signal Books. p. 346. ISBN 978-1909930384.
3. Slessor, Tim (2012). More than Cowboys: Travels through the History of the American West (1 ed.). Oxford: Signal Books. p. 307. ISBN 9781908493026.
4. Slessor, Tim (2004). Lying in State : How Whitehall Denies, Dissembles and Deceives - From the Chinook Crash to the Kelly Affair. Aurum Press Ltd. p. 336. ISBN 1845130308.
5. Slessor, Tim (2002). Ministries of Deception. Aurum Press Ltd. p. 256. ISBN 1854108778.
