= Myat Phaya Galay =

- H.R.H. Princess Ashin Hteik Suhpaya Mayat Phaya Galay
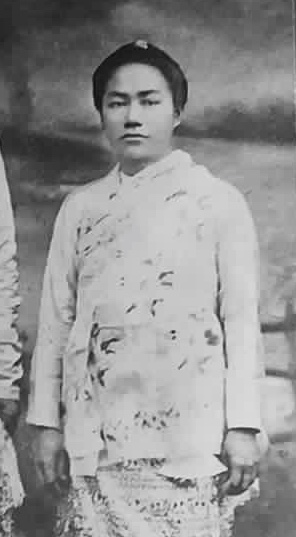
- Born: 25 April 1887; Ratnagiri, Bombay Presidency, British India
- Died: 3 March 1936 (aged 48); Moulmein, British Burma
- Spouse: Ko Ko Naing (m. 1920; died 1959)
- Issue: 4 sons, 2 daughters: Taw Phaya Gyi; Taw Phaya; Taw Phaya Nge; Taw Phaya Galay; Hteik Su Phaya Gyi; Hteik Su Phaya Htwe
- House: Royal House of Konbaung
- Father: Thibaw Min
- Mother: Supayalat
- Religion: Theravada Buddhism

Princess Myat Phaya Galay (Burmese: မြတ်ဖုရားကလေး; 25 April 1887 – 3 March 1936) was a Burmese royal princess and senior member of the Royal House of Konbaung. She was the fourth daughter of the last ruling king of Burma, King Thibaw, and his queen Supayalat.

== Biography ==
Myat Phaya Galay was born on 25 April 1887 in Ratnagiri, British India, where the royals had been coerced by British authority to relocate to. She returned to Burma from Ratnagiri in 1915, and ordered to reside in Moulmein in 1932.

The princess was fluent in English and acted as the royal family's spokesperson airing their grievances in a document called Sadutta thamidaw ayeidawbon sadan (စတုတ္ထသမီးတော်အရေးတော်ပုံစာတမ်း The Fourth Royal Daughter Crisis Document); she was sent away by the colonial government to live in Moulmein where she spent the rest of her days.

Myat Phaya Galay was called "Rebel Princess" by the British as she wrote a manifesto demanding the return of her father's kingdom and the royal gems and jewelry taken in their annexation of the country. She was the author of "Private affairs by H.R.H. the fourth Princess, daughter of the late H.M. King Thibaw and his crowned Queen of Burma whose inner facts are unknown to the public" (1931). She stirred up in the early 1930s by making a dramatic bid for the return of her father's kingdom. The British government came down like a sledgehammer and attempted to muzzle her by exiling her and her family to Moulmein, in Lower Burma. Here, distant from the influences and energy of the city that had been her father's capital, they hoped she would quietly settle down and not cause any more trouble.

Myat Phaya Galay died at her mansion on West Cantonment Road, Moulmein on 3 March 1936 and her husband died in Rangoon in 1959. It was in Moulmein that the princess met an untimely death that raised many suspicions. Her tomb is located near Kyaik Than Lan Pagoda, Moulmein (present-day Mawlamyine).

== Marriage and issue ==
Myat Phaya Galay married Ko Ko Naing, a former monk, in Rangoon on 1 July 1920. They had four sons and two daughters:

- Taw Phaya Gyi, birth at Rangoon, 6 May 1922 – died 9 April 1948.
- Hteik Su Phaya Gyi, birth at Rangoon, 5 April 1923 – died 31 December 2021.
- Taw Phaya, birth at Rangoon, 22 March 1924 – died 12 January 2019.
- Taw Phaya Nge, birth at Rangoon, 17 July 1925 – died 21 April 1995.
- Taw Phaya Galay, birth at Rangoon, 30 July 1926 – died 18 June 2006.
- Hteik Su Phaya Htwe, birth at Rangoon, 20 August 1927 – died 21 June 2003.

== Gallery ==
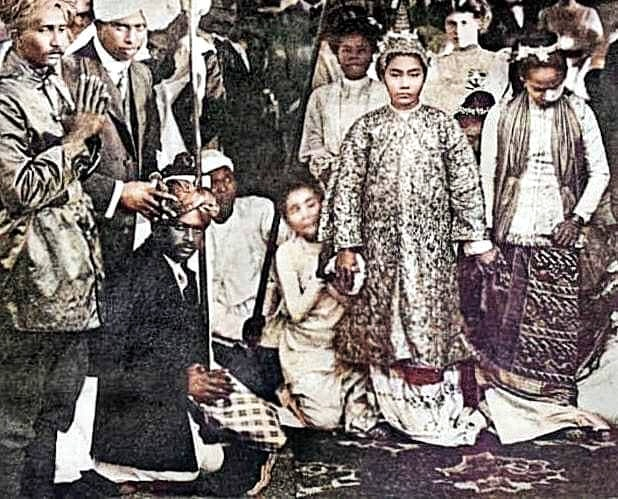
ear-boring ceremony of Princess Myat Phaya Galay at Ratnagiri

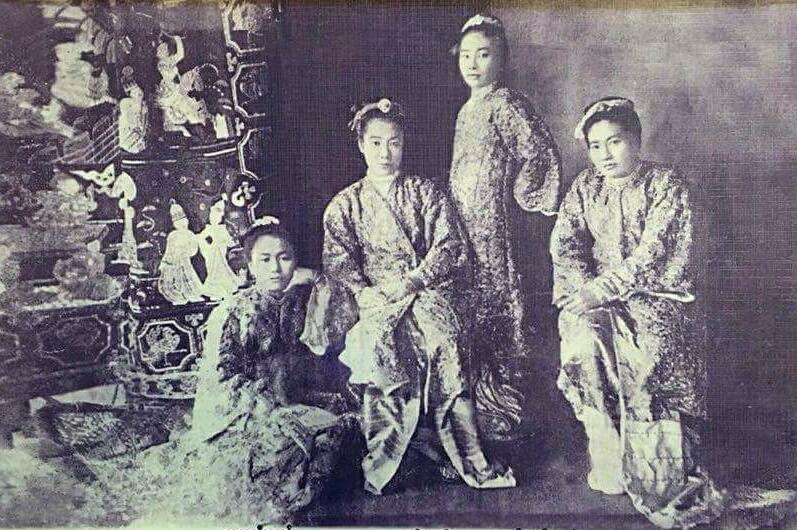
The four daughters of King Thibaw, Myat Phaya Galay, Myat Phaya Gyi, Myat Phaya Lat, Myat Phaya

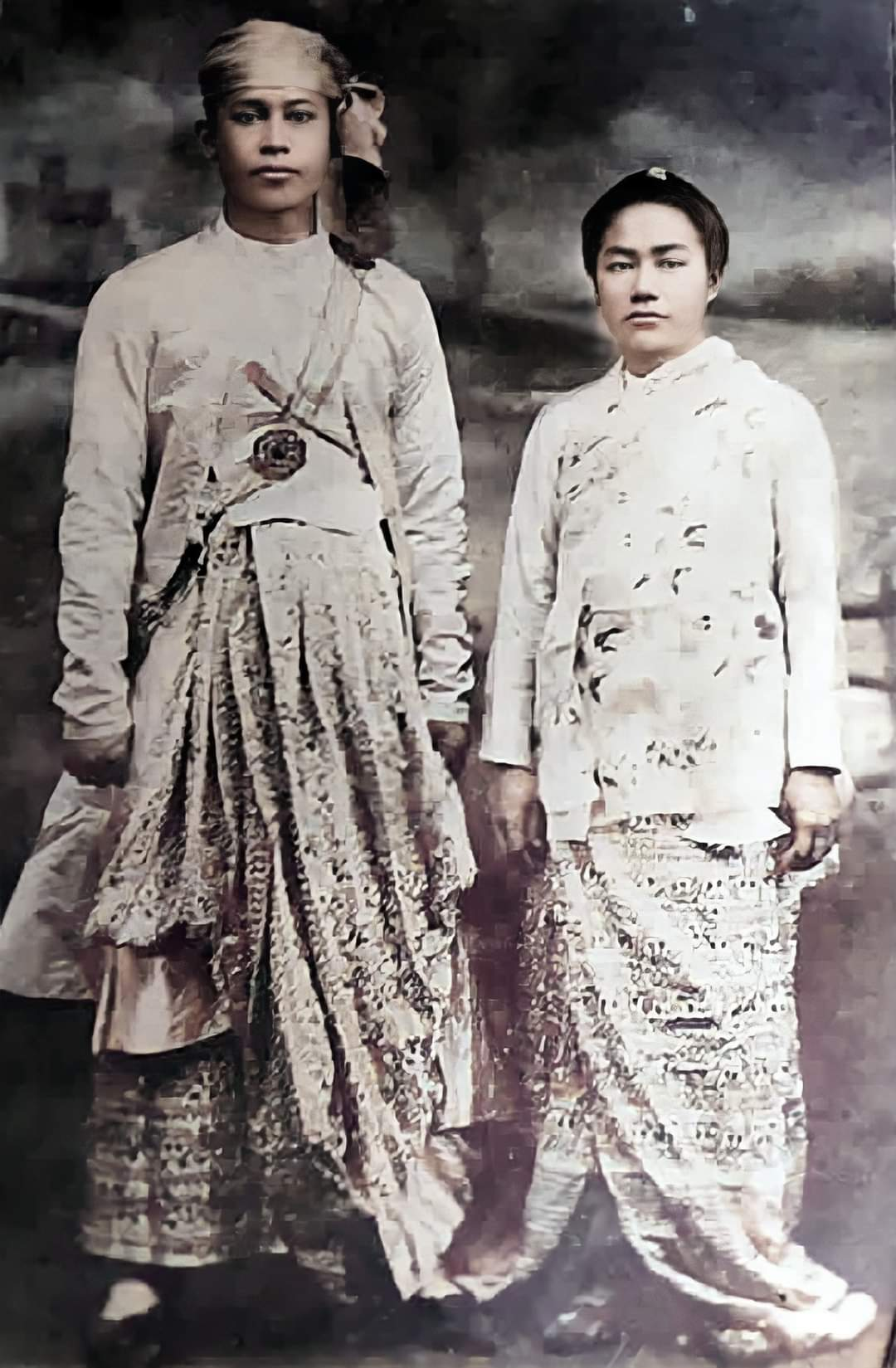
Myat Phaya Galay and her husband Ko Ko Naing
