= Hteik Su Phaya Gyi =

Burmese princess (1923–2021)

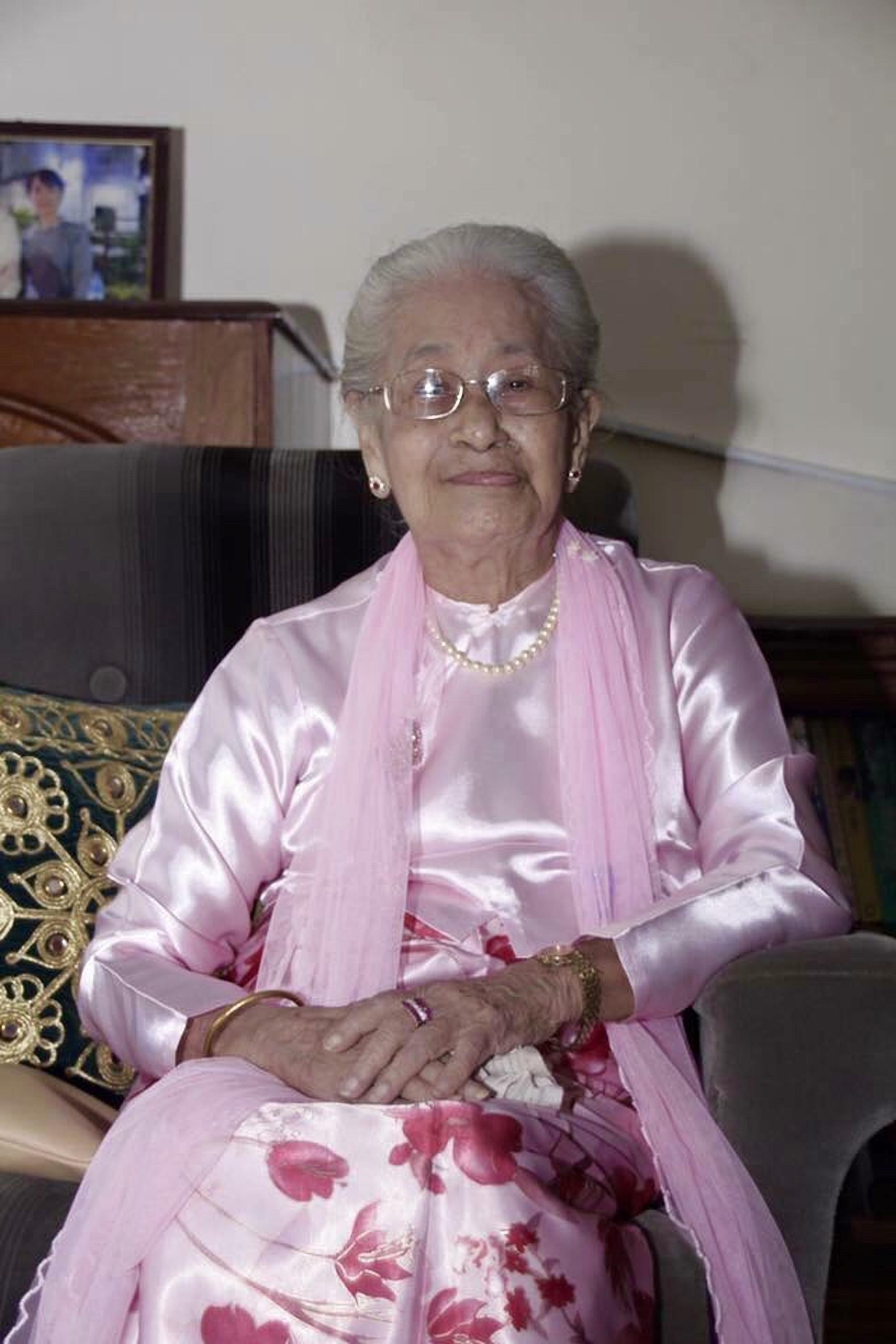
- The princess at her home in Yangon in 2018
- Born: Hteik Su Phaya Gyi; 5 April 1923; Rangoon (now Yangon), British Burma
- Died: 31 December 2021 (aged 98); Yangon, Myanmar
- Spouse: Maung Maung Khin (m. 1943; died 1984)
- Dynasty: Konbaung
- Father: Ko Ko Naing
- Mother: Myat Phaya Galay
- Religion: Theravada Buddhism

Princess Hteik Su Phaya Gyi (Burmese: ထိပ်စုဘုရားကြီး pronounced [tʰeɪʔ sṵ pʰə.yá dʑí]; 5 April 1923 – 31 December 2021), also known as Su Su Khin or Pwar May or Princess Tessie, was a Burmese princess and the final surviving royal of the Konbaung dynasty. Daughter of Princess Myat Phaya Galay (a daughter of the last king of Burma), she was a senior member of the Royal House of Konbaung.

Upon the death of her younger brother Taw Phaya in 2019, she became the last living grandchild of King Thibaw.

== Life ==
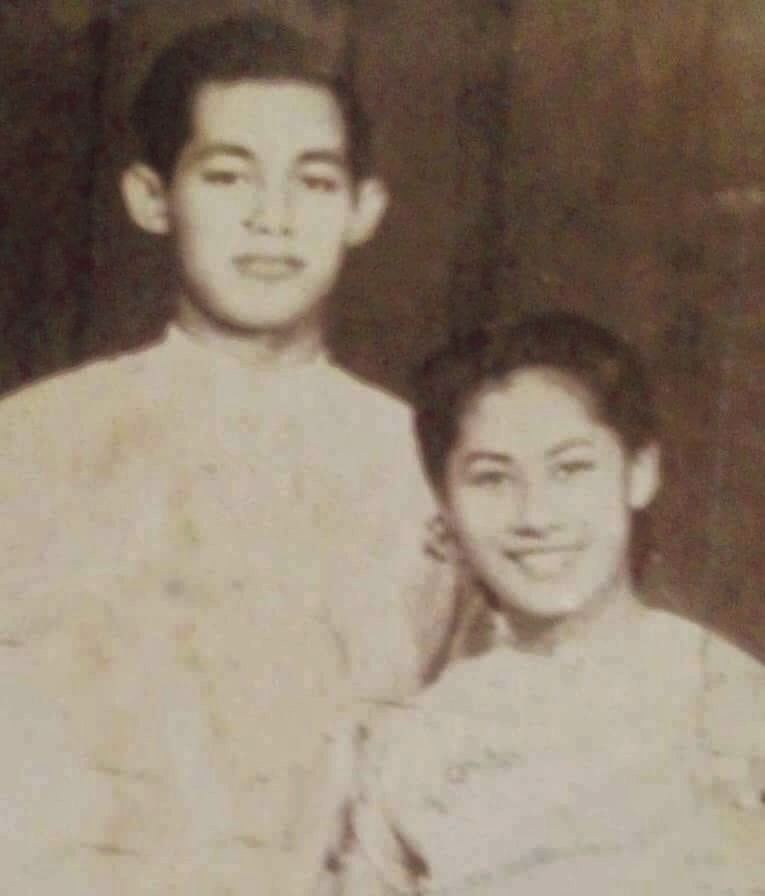
Hteik Su Phaya Gyi and her husband Maung Maung Khin

Hteik Su Phaya Gyi was born on 5 April 1923 in Rangoon, British Burma, to Ko Ko Naing and Princess Myat Phaya Galay, the fourth daughter of King Thibaw and Queen Supayalat. She went to a Catholic school in Moulmein and was employed at the U.S. and Australian embassies in Rangoon. Fluent in English, she worked as a private English language tutor for many years.

In a BBC interview, she asserted having received an engagement proposal from Ananda Mahidol of Thailand in 1936 when he was still a prince. The subsequent arrangements were reportedly overseen by her mother, sparking widespread expectations among many people at the time that she would become the future queen consort of Thailand. However, with the onset of World War II, the engagement discussions were halted and remained unresolved.

In 1943, she married Maung Maung Khin, a descendant of the Mon royal family. He was a nephew of Premier Ba Maw and a brother of Khin Kyi, the wife of her younger brother Taw Phaya Gyi. Maung Maung Khin died at Rangoon in 1984. She sought to bring King Thibaw's body back to Myanmar as part of her family's mission.

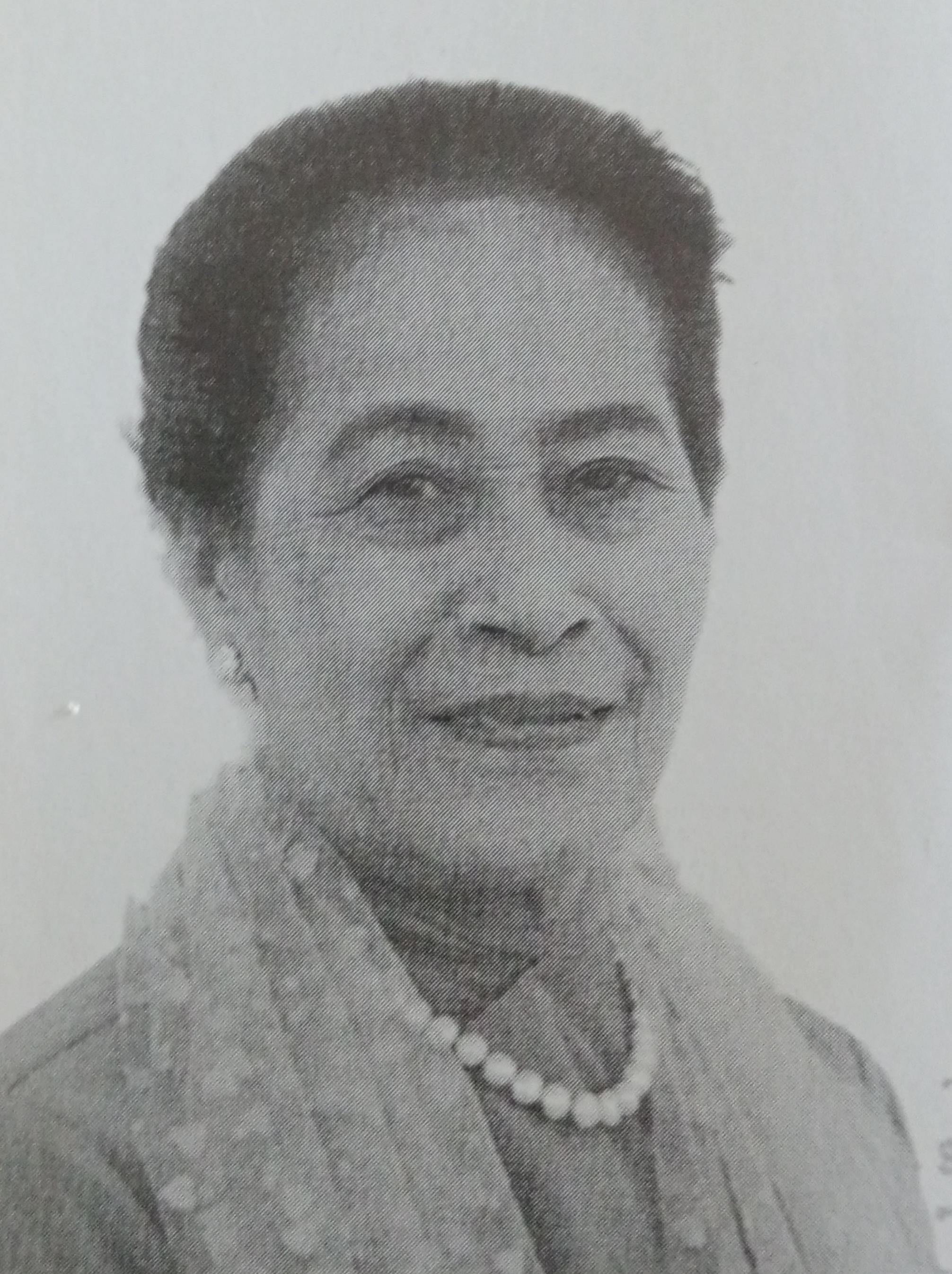
Princess Hteik Su Phaya Gyi in 2001

She died on 31 December 2021 at a Buddhist monastery in Yangon, at the age of 98. Her funeral was held at Yayway Cemetery in Yangon on 2 January 2022. She was survived by twenty grandchildren and seventeen great-grandchildren.

== Documentary film ==
In 2017, Hteik Su Phaya Gyi and her younger brother Taw Phaya, her nephew Soe Win, and her niece Devi Thant Sin appeared as the main characters of We Were Kings, a documentary film by Alex Bescoby and Max Jones. The film premiered in Mandalay on 4 November 2017 at the Irrawaddy Literary Festival and also screened in Thailand at the Foreign Correspondents' Club of Thailand. The film is about Myanmar's history, but also about the descendants of the last kings of Burma who lived unassuming lives in modern Myanmar, unrecognized and unknown.

== Family ==
She had three sons and two daughters: Win Khin (b. 1945), Kyaw Khin (b. 1948), Aung Khin (1953 – October 2008), Cho Cho Khin (b. 1943), and Devi Khin (b. 1951).

== Ancestry ==
Ancestors of Hteik Su Phaya Gyi

2. Ko Ko Naing
1. Hteik Su Phaya Gyi
12. Mindon Min (= 14)
6. Thibaw Min
13. Laungshe Mibaya
3. Mayat Phaya Galay
14. Mindon Min (= 12)
7. Supayalat
15. Hsinbyumashin
