= Oxford and Cambridge Far Eastern Expedition =

Transport publicity effort

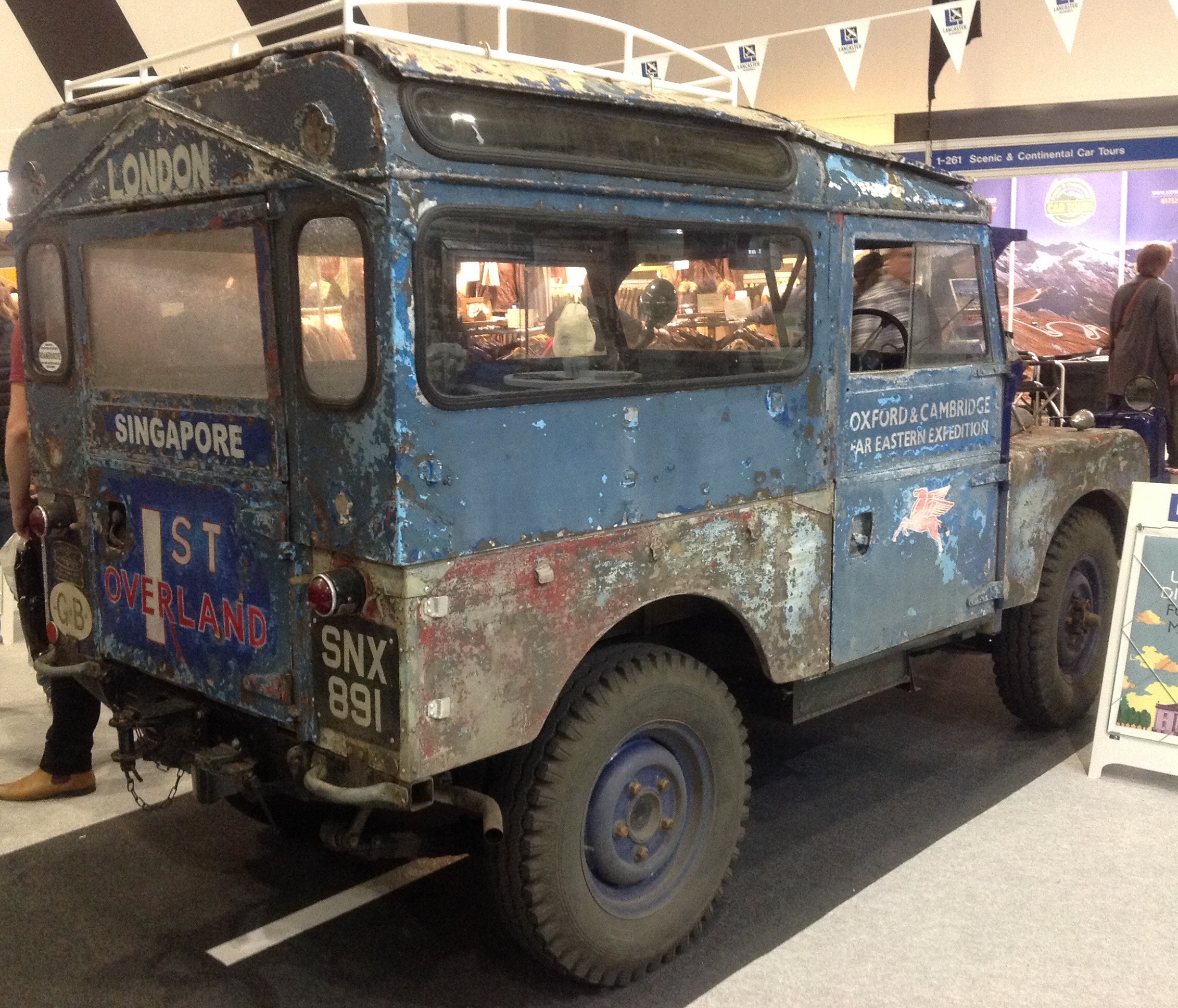
1955 Land Rover Series I "SNX 891" that took part in the London to Singapore trip.

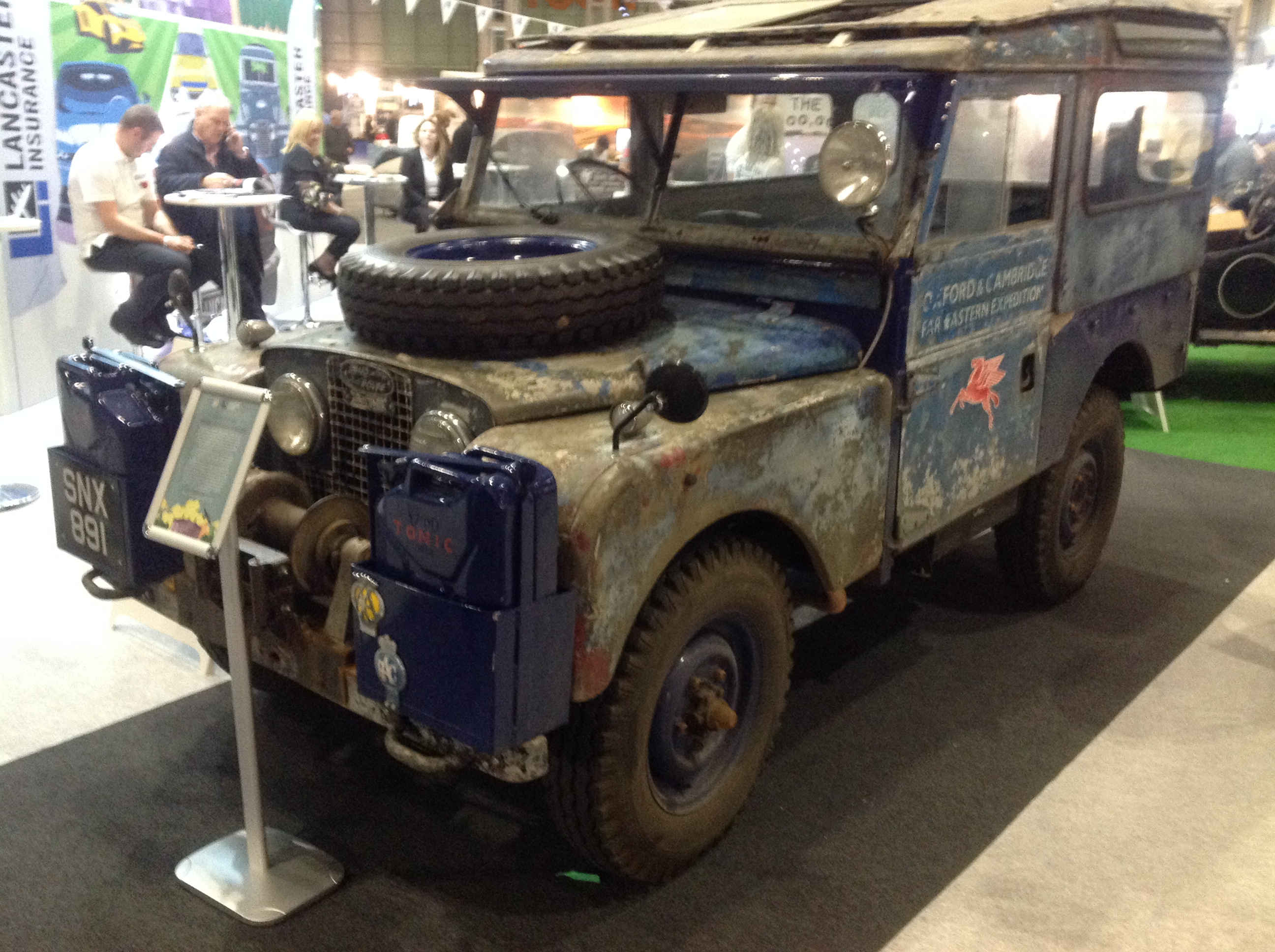
Same car as above

The 1955-56 Oxford and Cambridge Far Eastern Expedition was a publicity effort by the Rover Company as manufacturer of the Land Rover Series I 86" Station Wagons. The station wagons were very different from the previous Tickford model, being built with bolt-together aluminium panels. The journey was undertaken by six Oxford and Cambridge university students from London to Singapore.

The Oxford and Cambridge Far Eastern Expedition was inspired by the earlier 1954 Oxford and Cambridge Trans-Africa Expedition, developed by Adrian Cowell.

== Team members ==
All members were from either University of Cambridge or University of Oxford, and all had just finished their degrees when they set out on the expedition, with the exception of Nigel Newbery, who had one year left, and was the only Oxford student. The expedition members and their roles on the expedition were as follows:

- Antony "B.B." Barrington Brown - Cameraman
- Adrian Cowell - Business Manager
- Patrick Murphy - Navigator and Chef
- Nigel Newbery - Quartermaster and Mechanic
- Henry Nott - Chief Engineer
- Tim Slessor - Scribe and Assistant Cameraman

== Route ==
After setting off from Hyde Park in London, on 1 September 1955, the expedition was flown over to the European continent and from there continued through France, Monaco, Germany, Austria, Yugoslavia, Greece, Turkey, Syria, Iraq, Iran, Afghanistan, Pakistan, India, Nepal, Burma, Thailand, Malaya and Singapore.

Arriving on 6 March 1956, the journey took six months and six days, over 18,000 miles.

== Legacy ==
=== Oxford and Cambridge Expedition to South America (1957-8) ===
The next joint expedition was the 1957-8 Oxford and Cambridge Expedition to South America, on which at least two team members from the Singapore journey took part: Adrian Cowell and Nigel Newbery.

=== Eric Edis expedition (1957-9) ===
Between 1957 and 1959, Eric Edis led a fifteen-person team on an overland expedition from London to Singapore and then on to Australia and back to the UK - the first man to make the round trip overland and with no sponsorship. He was also the only man to cross the 'closed' Burmese border twice unaided. See Eric Edis' book The Impossible Takes A Little Longer.

=== First Overland (1957) ===
First Overland: London-Singapore by Land Rover is the 1957 book recounting the expedition by Tim Slessor, originally published by The Companion Book Club under the title First Overland: The Story of the Oxford and Cambridge Far Eastern Expedition. The 2005 50th anniversary edition, published by Signal Books Ltd, also contains a foreword by Sir David Attenborough, who is listed as co-author. The book is the main source of information about the expedition and its fullest account, as the footage and subsequent programmes made with it only cover a small portion of what the six students did and experienced on their long journey.

=== 50th Anniversary of the Expedition (2006) ===
On the 50th Anniversary of the Expedition, the five surviving members (all except Henry Nott) traveled once more to the Far East and recreated the last leg of their journey, covering the 350 km from Kuala Lumpur to Singapore on 4 March 2006. The following day, the five men did the one thing they forgot in 1956 - they followed Rudyard Kipling's instruction to "feed at Raffles" and enjoyed brunch at the Bar and Billiard Room and Singapore Slings at the Long Bar.

The 1955 route is now largely impassable, because of the wars in Iraq and Afghanistan.

== The Last Overland ==
At the age of 87, Tim Slessor and historian and filmmaker Alex Bescoby in one of the original Land Rovers, "Oxford", planned re-creating the first London to Singapore trip by doing it in reverse. Unfortunately Tim Slessor was taken ill on the day they were due to leave Singapore, 25 August 2019, and was not able to participate, but his grandson, Nat George, stepped in and took his place, arriving in London 111 days later on 14 December 2019. These team build with Multi international Team, Larry Leong from Singapore as Safety officer, Marcus Alleander from Uk as Manager Expedition, Dr Silverius Purba from Indonesia as doctor, Mechanic, main driver for Oxford, David Israeli from USA as videographer, Leopold from France as Videographer, TB from France as Social Media expert. Tim Bescoby wrote a book on the subject, "Last Overland" and a Channel 4 documentary was also produced.

== Adaption for screen ==
The expedition set out with only a limited quantity of film from the BBC, but with the promise of more from David Attenborough if the initial material sent back was good. In the end there was enough material for 3 short films for the BBC series 'Traveller's Tales' which were shot in colour, but only transmitted in black and white.

In the late 1950s there was no home recording technology like VHS, so once broadcast, the films faded from view and have only been seen occasionally since. Recently they have been re-mastered and edited, with a commentary by the cameraman Antony Barrington-Brown and Tim Slessor, and interviews with Nigel Newbery, Pat Murphy, Adrian Cowell and Sir David Attenborough. The DVD also has an 'extra' about the making of the original films and the rescuing of the footage.

== Bibliography ==
- Slessor, Tim. (1957), First Overland: The Story of the Oxford and Cambridge Far Eastern Expedition, The Companion Book Club, London. ASIN: B0000CJTJQ
