= Oxford and Cambridge Trans-Africa Expedition =

Race undertaken in 1954

The Oxford and Cambridge Trans-Africa Expedition was a race undertaken in 1954 between undergraduates of Oxford and Cambridge universities, crossing Africa from north to south - Cape Town - and back again. The journey traversed 25,000 miles. It was supposed to be undertaken during the 'long vac' (university summer holidays from June–October) with the teams leaving the UK in June 1954 but overran and the Expedition did not arrive back in the UK until December 1954.

The Expedition vehicles were two Land Rover Series I 86" station wagons - one for each three-man university team, and was won by Oxford. The Expedition travelled through Tunisia, across the Sahara, into Egypt, through Ethiopia,

The genesis of the race came as a bet in a bar in Hong Kong between David Waters and Adrian Cowell (who developed and planned the Expedition but was eventually unable to take part). The teams obtained sponsorship and part of the object of the Expedition was to test equipment for some 50 British firms, and to collect information on routes for the explorers' clubs of the two universities.

The Expedition was such a success that it inspired Adrian Cowell to formulate and take part in the famed 1955-6 Oxford and Cambridge Far Eastern Expedition, which travelled overland from London to Singapore in two Land Rovers.

In September 2011 author Michael Bishop mentioned in his blog an unfinished book on the Expedition written by one of the team members, which Bishop was hoping to help get published by the end of that year. This book 'Boat Race on Wheels: The Oxford Cambridge Trans-Africa Expedition 1954' was finally published in 2023

== Team members ==
- Gethin Bradley (Cambridge)
- Don Calman (Oxford. Australian)
- Ross Charlton (Cambridge. Australian. Cameraman)
- Tony Morgan (Oxford)
- 'Buzz' Piggott (Cambridge. American)
- David Waters (Oxford)

In addition, Adrian Cowell of Cambridge was involved in the development and planning but unable to take part in the expedition itself.
