= Taw Phaya =

- Prince Taw Phaya

Head of the Royal House of Konbaung
- Tenure: 21 July 1962 – 12 January 2019
- Predecessor: Myat Phaya
- Successor: Soe Win
- Born: 22 March 1924; Maymyo, British Burma
- Died: 12 January 2019 (aged 94); Pyin U Lwin, Myanmar
- Spouse: Phaya Rita (m. 1944; died 2019)
- Issue: 5 sons, 2 daughters: Richard Taw Phaya Myat Gyi; David Taw Phaya Myat; Edward Taw Phaya Myat Nge; Joseph Taw Phaya Myat Aye; Paul Taw Phaya Myat Thaike; Ann-Marie Su Phaya Lay; Rose-Marie Su Phaya Naing
- Father: Ko Ko Naing
- Mother: Myat Phaya Galay

Prince Edward Taw Phaya (Burmese: တော်ဘုရား; also known as Tun Aung, 22 March 1924 – 12 January 2019) was the Pretender to the Throne of Burma (abolished in 1885). He was the second son of Princess Myat Phaya Galay, the fourth daughter of King Thibaw and Queen Supayalat. Upon the death of his aunt Myat Phaya Lat in 1956, he became the Head of the Royal House of Konbaung.

== Biography ==
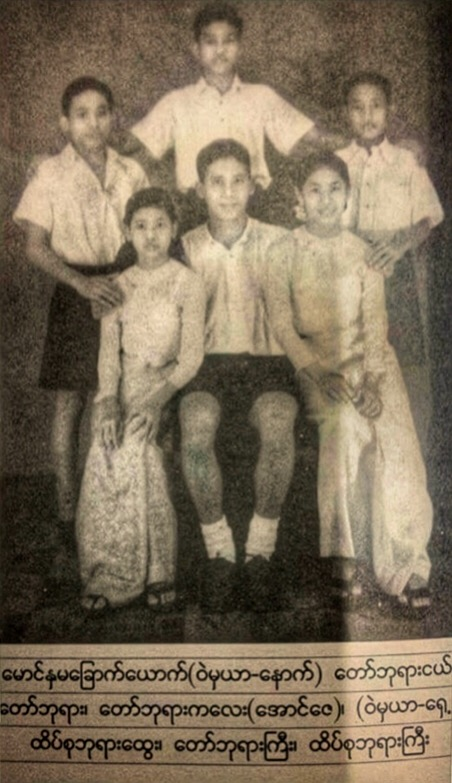
Six siblings of Taw Phaya

Taw Phaya was born on 22 March 1924 in Maymyo, British Burma to Ko Ko Naing, a former monk, and Princess Myat Phaya Galay who was the fourth daughter of King Thibaw and Queen Supayalat. He attended high school at St. Patrick's High School Moulmein and St. Paul's School in Rangoon.

According to newspapers of the era, Taw Phaya was known as a prince who won prizes in swimming and running competitions. During the war, Thakin Kodaw Hmaing entrusted him, along with Taw Phaya Gyi, with traveling to Sagaing to care for his aunt Myat Phaya and her daughter Hteik Su Gyi Phaya, who were facing hardships there. Upon arriving in Yangon, Myat Phaya consulted Thakin Kodaw Hmaing regarding a marriage. She explained that before Queen Supayalat passed away, she had instructed that Taw Phaya and Hteik Su Gyi Phaya be wed, as they shared the same day of the week for their birthdays, similar to King Thibaw and Queen Supayalat. Later, during the Japanese occupation, Thakin Kodaw Hmaing personally served as a witness and conducted the engagement ceremony at his home.

On 4 May 1944, he married his first cousin, Princess Hteik Su Gyi Phaya, also known as Phaya Rita. After his mother's death, he became the head of the family and of the royal mansion in Maymyo. The Maymyo mansion was known for continuing abolished courtly traditions and royal customs. According to the writer Ludu Sein Win, who visited the residence to pay his respects, guests entering the mansion were required to approach by crawling on their knees and bowing respectfully at each stage of the encounter.

He worked as a director of Thibaw Commercial Syndicate (TCS) Co. Ltd. from 1951 to 1962. He also served as vice president of the Association for Buddhism as the National Religion in 1958.

Although Taw Phaya was not as politically active as his younger brother, Taw Phaya Galay, he often provided critical insights on Myanmar politics to foreign journalists who visited him. Even though his nephew, Brigadier General Win Myint (the writer Hlaing Thin), served as Deputy Minister for Construction under the SLORC (State Law and Order Restoration Council) government, Taw Phaya continued to voice his opinions courageously. Aware that the military government kept him under constant surveillance, Taw Phaya once wittily remarked that the authorities were watching him so closely that they even knew when he passed gas in his own home.

Taw Phaya and his family once participated in the military caretaker government's anti-communist mission in 1959 because the family was known for promoting Buddhist activities. Military officials invited them to visit Shwebo, the birthplace of the Konbaung dynasty. After witnessing local women spreading their hair in welcome of the Taw Phaya family, the Tatmadaw reportedly viewed the royal family as a potential rival for influence. As a result, the military later ignored the royal family.

== Documentary film ==
In 2017, Taw Phaya and his elder sister Hteik Su Phaya Gyi, along with his nephew, Soe Win and niece, Devi Thant Sin, were subjects of the documentary film We Were Kings, directed by Alex Bescoby and Max Jones. The film premiered in Mandalay on 4 November 2017 at the Irrawaddy Literary Festival and was also screened in Thailand at the Foreign Correspondents' Club of Thailand. The film is about Myanmar's history, but also about the descendants of the last kings of Burma who lived unassuming lives in modern Myanmar, unrecognized and unknown.

== Death ==
Taw Phaya died on 12 January 2019 at his Pyin Oo Lwin residence. After his death, his eldest son, Richard Taw Phaya could be presumed to be the Head of the Royal House of Konbaung, although no confirmation has been made since. The more politically active nephew of Taw Phaya, Soe Win is more often seen as the current pretender.

== Family ==
Taw Phaya had five sons and two daughters:

- Richard Taw Phaya Myat Gyi (born 14 May 1945), He married two times, he first married at Rangoon in May 1962 to Hteik Su Margaret Phaya Htwe (b. at Rangoon, 20 August 1927; d. from a brain haemorrhage, at Maymyo, 21st June, 2003), his paternal aunt, younger daughter of U Ko Ko Naing, by his wife, H.R.H. Princess (Ashin Hteik Suhpaya) Mayat Phaya Galay. m. (second) at Rangoon, 1993, Myint Myint Aye. He had issue, one son by his first wife:
  - Maung Aung Khine (b. 1962)
- David Taw Phaya Myat (born 1 April 1947).
- Edward Taw Phaya Myat Nge (born 27 April 1948 - died 14 November 1955).
- Joseph Taw Phaya Myat Aye (born 19 March 1950).
- Paul Taw Phaya Myat Thaike (born 19 February 1954).
- Ann-Marie Su Phaya Lay (born 10 September 1952).
- Rose-Marie Su Phaya Naing (born 21 April 1956).

== Ancestry ==
Ancestors of Taw Phaya

2. Ko Ko Naing
1. Taw Phaya
24. Tharrawaddy Min (= 28)
12. Mindon Min (= 14)
25. Chandra Mata Mahay (= 29)
6. Thibaw Min
26. Maung Mey
13. Prabha Devi
3. Mayat Phaya Galay
28. Tharrawaddy Min (= 24)
14. Mindon Min (= 12)
29. Chandra Mata Mahay (= 25)
7. Prabha Ratna Devi
30. Sagaing Min
15. Hsinphyuma Shin
31. Rajendra Ratna Devi

Taw Phaya Konbaung Dynasty Born: 22 March 1924
Royal titles
Preceded by Myat Phaya	Heir to the Burmese Throne; 1962 – 2019	Succeeded by Soe Win
