= Foreign Correspondents' Club of Thailand =

Press club in Bangkok

- สมาคมผู้สื่อข่าวต่างประเทศแห่งประเทศไทย
- Formation: 1957; 69 years ago
- Headquarters: Maneeya Center Building, Phloen Chit Road, Pathum Wan, Bangkok, Thailand
- Leader: Elaine Kurtenbach (president)

The Foreign Correspondents' Club of Thailand (FCCT; Thai: สมาคมผู้สื่อข่าวต่างประเทศแห่งประเทศไทย) was founded in 1957 in Bangkok's Patpong area. It is considered the oldest and largest press club in Southeast Asia. After the Vietnam War ended in 1975, Laos, Cambodia, and Vietnam were mostly inaccessible for foreign journalists, leading to FCCT becoming a regional hub for journalism. Today, the FCCT hosts exhibitions for photojournalism and contemporary arts.

The club's current location is the Maneeya Center Building, on Phloen Chit Road in Pathum Wan District.

Elaine Kurtenbach, Asia business editor for the Associated Press, serves as the club's president.

== History ==
=== 20th century ===
The FCCT's informal origins began in the mid-1950s, when groups of foreign media correspondents gathered at Mizu’s Kitchen on Patpong Road. Original members included principal founder, Jorges Orgibet, who worked in Thailand for the US Office of War Information and opened the US Information Service (USIS) office in Bangkok.

=== 21st century ===
On 2 September 2014, Thai Lawyers for Human Rights cancelled a planned briefing on at the Foreign Correspondents’ Club under pressure from the National Council for Peace and Order, Thailand's ruling military junta.

In December 2015, United States Ambassador to Thailand Glyn T. Davies was investigated for violating Thailand's lèse-majesté laws while speaking at the Foreign Correspondents’ Club on 25 November 2015. Davies gave a speech praising the US-Thailand relationship, and expressed concern about lengthy prison sentences given by military courts to Thai civilians. Davies, who was protected under diplomatic immunity, was not charged with a crime.
