= Supaya =

Title given to the daughters of the Chief Queen

Supaya (Burmese: စုဖုရား, also spelt suphaya) is the highest royal title for the Burmese royal princesses. The title is given only to the daughters of the Chief Queen, and those of blue-blooded queens. It is said that there were only 8 princesses given the title of Supaya during the reign of King Mindon. This royal title is "Princess Royal".

== Recipients ==
The awarded eight princesses during the reign of King Mindon are as follows.

No.	Title	Photo	Mother	Reference
1	Mai Naung Supayagyi		The Queen of the Central Palace, Hsinbyumashin	
2	Myadaung Supayalat		The Queen of the Central Palace, Hsinbyumashin	
3	Yamethin Supayalay		The Queen of the Central Palace, Hsinbyumashin	
4	Pakhangyi Supaya		King Thibaw's mother Laungshe Mibaya	
5	Meiktila Supaya		King Thibaw's mother Laungshe Mibaya	
6	Mingin Supaya		Magway Mibaya	
7	Pyinzi Supaya		Magway Mibaya	
8	Salin Supaya (Note: Salin Supaya was not a blue blood. However, King Mindon conferred the title of Supaya since she was the most dearest daughter of King Mindon, as the saying goes, "Son Kyapin, daughter Salin".)		Limban Mibaya	

== See also ==
- Burmese royal titles
