= Pyinzi Supaya =

Burmese royal princess

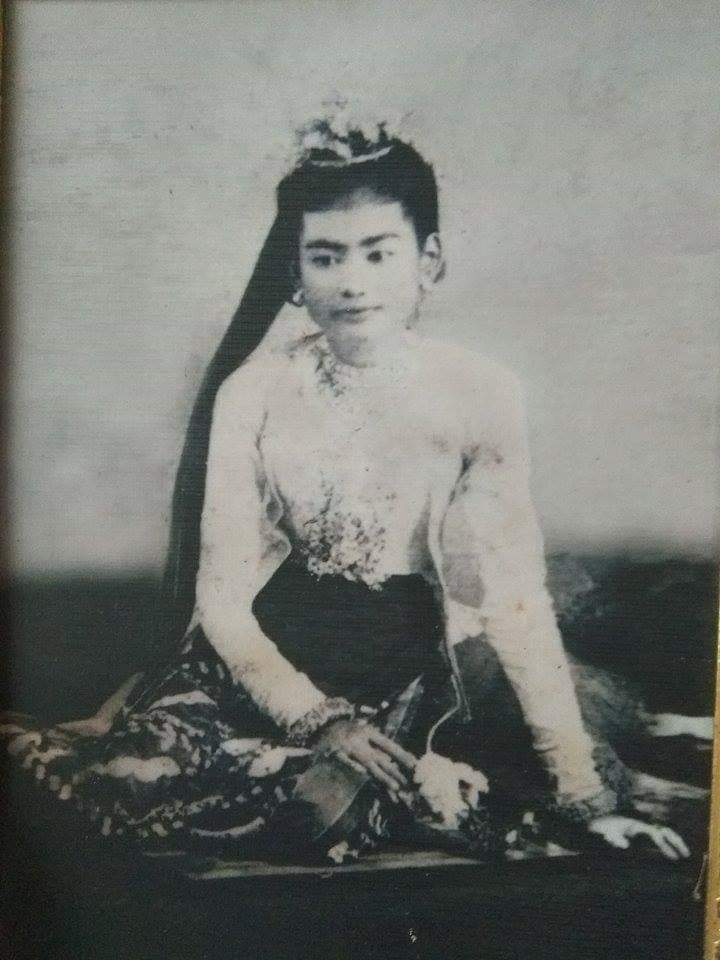
- Pyinzi Supaya

Princess of Pyinzi
- Reign: 1866–1885
- Predecessor: Thado Minye
- Successor: Disestablished

Princess of Taungdwingyaung
- Reign: 1861–1866
- Born: 1861; Mandalay Palace
- Died: 1915 (aged 53–54); Mandalay
- Burial: Konbaung tombs
- Spouse: U Pe
- Issue: Pyinzi Thameedawgyi; Pyinzi Thameedawlat; Pyinzi Kodawle
Regnal name
- Thu Pabawadi
- House: Konbaung
- Father: King Mindon
- Mother: Magway Mibaya
- Religion: Theravada Buddhism

Thu Pabawadi (Burmese: သုပဘာဝတီ, Supabhāvatī; 1861–1915), commonly known as Pyinzi Princess (Burmese: ပြင်စည်မင်းသမီး) or Pyinzi Supaya (Burmese: ပြင်စည်စုဖုရား), was a high-ranking royal princess of the late Konbaung dynasty of Burma.

== Life ==
Pyinzi Supaya was born to King Mindon and his consort Magway Mibaya in 1861 at the Mandalay Palace. Her father gave her the appanage of Taungdwingyaung. When Thado Minye, Prince of Pyinzi, was assassinated in the Myingun Myinkhondaing rebellion, she received the appanage of Pyinzi, and was known thereafter as Pyinzi Princess.

When her sister, Mingin Supaya was found guilty of having sexual relationship with a commoner and was ordered to be imprisoned for violating social taboos concerning sex, her family and its servants were sent as slaves to Man Aung Yadana Wakhingone Pagoda. On 25 April 1883, at a sayadaw's request, Supayalat set them free, but they remained under house arrest until the abdication of King Thibaw in 1885. Although they were not favored by Supayalat, she remained on good terms with the family and attended the ear-boring ceremony of the daughters of King Thibaw and Queen Supayalat in Ratnagiri in 1910.

Pyinzi Supaya died on 18 May 1915 at the age of 54 and was buried in the Mandalay Palace enclosure (see Konbaung tombs).

== Distinctions ==
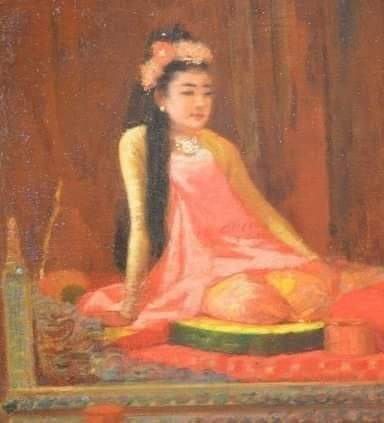
Portrait of Pyinzi Supaya painted by James Raeburn Middleton

Because her mother was senior royalty, Pyinzi Supaya received the title Supaya. She accompanied Setkya Dewi whenever she traveled about the palace in the royal palanquin and was one of eleven princesses who had the right to wear ghanamattaka clothes during King Mindon's reign.

At the Rajabiseka Muddha consecration of her father in 1874, Pyinzi Supaya, wearing ghanamattaka clothes, together with her seven sisters, poured a libation on the king's head and made speeches.

== Family ==
Pyinzi Supaya married U Pe and gave birth to three daughters Pyinzi Thameedawgyi, Pyinzi Thameedawlat, and Pyinzi Kodawle. Pyinzi Kodawle died at a young age. The British government contributed 15 rupees to fund her daughters' educations.
