= Burmese royal titles =

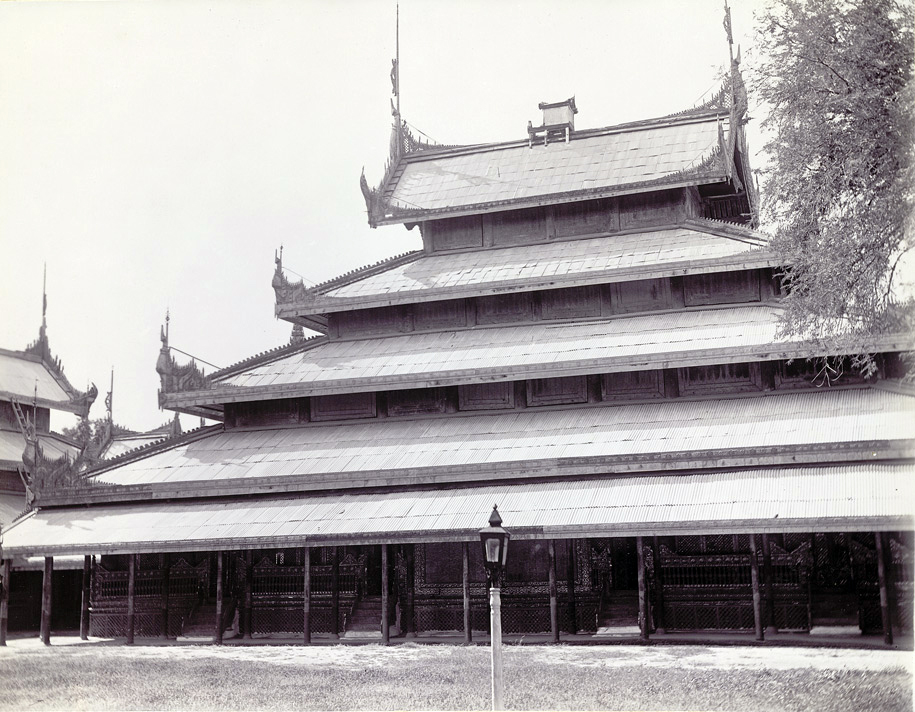
Only the four main queens (Nanya Mibaya) were allowed to live at the Glass Palace in the Mandalay Palace, along with the King.

Burmese royal titles are the royal styles that were in use by the Burmese monarchy until the disintegration of the last Burmese monarchy, the Konbaung dynasty, in 1885. These titles were exclusively used by those of royal lineage (မင်းမျိုးမင်းနွယ်; ထီးရိုးနန်းရိုး; ဆွေတော်မျိုးတော်), or more formally, Maha Zi Maha Thwei (မဟာဆီမဟာသွေး).

== Titles and rank in the Konbaung dynasty ==
=== King ===
Kings in Burma assumed a distinctive regnal name and title, usually a combination of Pali and Sanskrit, upon ascending to the throne.

The King was known by a variety of titles, including the following:

- Hpondawgyi (Hlathaw) Hpaya (ဘုန်းတော်ကြီး(လှသော)ဘုရား [pʰóʊɰ̃dɔ̀dʑí pʰəjá])
- Ashin Hpaya (အရှင်ဘုရား [əʃɪ̀ɰ̃ pʰəjá])
- Shwe Nan Shin Hpaya (ရွှေနန်းရှင်ဘုရား)
- Ekarit Min Myat (ဧကရာဇ် မင်းမြတ်)
- Shin Bayin (ရှင်ဘုရင်)
- Athet U San Paing Than Ashin (အသက်ဦးဆံပိုင်သန်အရှင်, lit. 'Lord of the life, head, and hair of all beings')
- Shwe Nan Shwe Pyatthat Thahkin (ရွှေနန်းရွှေပြာသာဒ်သခင်, lit. 'Master Lord of the Golden Palace and Golden Spired Roofs') - used in the Taungoo and Konbaung dynasties
- Hkamedaw (ခမည်းတော် [kʰəmɛ́dɔ̀], lit. 'royal father') - by his children (the princes and princesses)
- Dagadaw Yemyeshin (ဒကာတော်ရေမြေရှင်) - by Buddhist monks
- Dagadaw Ekarit Min Myat (ဒကာတော်ဧကရာဇ်မင်းမြတ်) - by Buddhist monks

=== King's consorts ===
In the early days of the Konbaung Dynasty, Kings had at most three Senior Queens. Innovations of a fourth Senior Queen and four lesser queens dated to the last quarter of the 1700s.

Queens of first rank (Senior Queens) were called Nanya Mibaya (နန်းရ မိဖုရား, lit. 'Queens who Possess Palaces'). The expansion and ranking of Senior Queens was an innovation during the reign of King Singu Min (1776-1782). In order of precedence, they were as follows:

1. Supreme Royal Chief Queen (နန်းမတော် မိဖုရားခေါင်ကြီး, Nanmadaw Mibaya Hkaunggyi) or Royal Queen of the Southern Palace (တောင်နန်း(မ)တော် မိဖုရား(ခေါင်ကြီး), Taung Nandaw Mibaya) - As the Supreme Chief Queen, she alone had the right to a white umbrella and to sit with the King on the royal throne. She was also variously known as Taung Nyazan (တောင်ညာစံ), Ashin Nanmadaw Hpaya (အရှင်နန်းမတော်ဘုရား). and Nanmadaw (နန်းမတော်)
2. Royal Queen of the Northern Palace (မြောက်နန်းတော် မိဖုရား, Myauk Nandaw Mibaya)
3. Royal Queen of the Central Palace (အလယ်နန်းတော် မိဖုရား, Ale Nandaw Mibaya)
4. Royal Queen of the Western Palace (အနောက်နန်းတော် မိဖုရား, Anauk Nandaw Mibaya)

There was a special position between Nanya Mibaya (first rank) and Ahsaungya Mibaya (second rank) named Nanzwe Mibaya (နန်းဆွယ်မိဖုရား), for the blue-blood sisters of the King, primed to become a Nanya Mibaya if any of them died. For example, when the first Anauk Nandaw Mibaya of King Mindon, Pintale Mibaya died, her sister Yinge Mibaya, one of the four Nanzwe Mibayas of King Mindon, was replaced as the second Anauk Nandaw Mibaya. (Note: The four Nanzwe Mibayas during the reign of King Mindon were Yinge Mibaya, Laungshe Mibaya, Magway Mibaya and Seindon Mibaya.) As they were the blue-blooded ones, they could not be given the position of ordinary queens. So they became Nanzwe Mibayas. This position was created only during the reign of a king who had many queens, such as Bodawpaya and Mindon Min.

Royal Queens of second rank were known as Ahsaungya Mibaya (အဆောင်ရမိဖုရား, lit. 'Queens who Possess Royal Apartments'). These ranks were created during the reign of King Tharrawaddy Min (1837-1846). In order of precedence, they were as follows:

1. Royal Queen of the Southern Apartment (တောင်ဆောင်တော် မိဖုရား, Taung Hsaungdaw Mibaya)
2. Royal Queen of the Northern Apartment (မြောက်ဆောင်တော် မိဖုရား, Myauk Hsaungdaw Mibaya)

Royal Queens of third rank were known as Shweye Hsaungya Mibaya (ရွှေရေးဆောင်ရ မိဖုရား, lit. 'Royal Queens who Possess the Gilded Chambers'). These were innovations dating to the reign of King Bodawphaya. In order of precedence, they were as follows:

1. Royal Queen of the Southern Gilded Chamber (မြန်အောင်တောင်ရွှေရေးဆောင် မိဖုရား, Myan Aung Taung Shweye Hsaung Mibaya)
2. Royal Queen of the Northern Gilded Chamber (မြန်အောင်မြောက်ရွှေရေးဆောင် မိဖုရား, Myan Aung Myauk Shweye Hsaung Mibaya)
3. Royal Queen of the Central Gilded Chamber (မြန်အောင်အလယ်ရွှေရေးဆောင် မိဖုရား, Myan Aung Ale Shweye Hsaung Mibaya)
4. Royal Queen of the Western Gilded Chamber (မြန်အောင်အနောက်ရွှေရေးဆောင် မိဖုရား, Myan Aung Anauk Shweye Hsaung Mibaya)

Royal Queens of fourth rank were considered minor consorts:

1. Myosa Mibaya ('town-lord queen'; မြို့စားမိဖုရား)
2. Ywaza Mibaya ('village-lord queen'; ရွာစား မိဖုရား)

Royal concubines were typically the daughters of officials and tributary princes. They received no rank and in order of precedence were as follows:

1. Kolottaw (ကိုယ်လုပ်တော်, lit. 'one who administers the royal body')
2. Chedawtin (ခြေတော်တင်, lit. 'one on whom the royal feet are placed')
3. Maungma (မောင်းမ)

Consorts were granted titles based on rank, divided into two grades (queens and for concubines).

The styles of queens contained the following words based on rank, as follows (in order of precedence):

1. Devī (ဒေဝီ, Pali 'goddess')
2. Mahe (မဟေ, Pali 'queen') or Hesī (ဟေသီ, Pali 'queen')
3. Sīri (သီရိ, Pali 'splendour')
4. Su (သု, Pali 'well')
5. Min (မင်း, Burmese 'lord')

The styles of royal concubines contained the following words based on rank, as follows (in order of precedence):

1. Devī (ဒေဝီ, Pali 'goddess')
2. Vatī (ဝတီ, Pali 'dutiful')
3. Rujā (ရုဇာ)
4. Pabhā (ပဘာ, Pali 'radiance')
5. Kesā (ကေသာ, Pali 'hair')
6. Candā (စန္ဒာ, Pali 'moon')
7. Mālā (မာလာ, Pali 'garland')
8. Muttā (မုတ္တာ, Pali 'pearl')

=== Princes ===
Royal princes included the sons and brothers of the King (Minnyi Mintha) who were ranked, as follows (in order of precedence):

1. Crown Prince (အိမ်ရှေ့မင်းသား, Einshay Mintha) - the Heir Apparent, who was appointed by the King and second only to the King in precedence. He was also known as the Uparaja (ဥပရာဇာ).
2. Great Princes (မင်းသားကြီး, Minthagyi) - First-grade princes (the King's brothers and the sons of Senior Queens). There were 18 Great Princes at any given time, divided into 9 of the left and 9 of the right.
  1. Shwe Kodawgyi Awratha (ရွှေကိုယ်တော်ကြီး ဩရသ): The eldest son of the King, by his chief Queen
  2. Shwe Kodawgyi Razaputra (ရွှေကိုယ်တော်ကြီး ရာဇပုတြ): The younger sons of the King, by his chief Queen
  3. Shwe Kodawgyi (ရွှေကိုယ်တော်ကြီး): The sons of the King, by his senior Queens
3. Middle Princes (မင်းသားလတ်, Minthalat) - Second grade princes born of lesser queens. There were 18 Middle Princes at any given time, divided into 9 of the left and 9 of the right.
  1. Kodawgyi (ကိုယ်တော်ကြီး): The sons of the King, by his junior wives
4. Princes (မင်းသား, Mintha) - Minor princes born of concubines

Non-royal princes were individuals of non-royal lineage who were promoted to the rank of prince, and were divided into there ranks, each of which consisted of 18 princes at any given time, divided into 9 of the left and 9 of the right. They were ranked, as follows (in order of precedence):

1. Great Princes (မင်းသားကြီး, Minthagyi) – The first grade of non-royal princes
2. Middle Princes (မင်းသားလတ်, Minthalat) – The second grade of non-royal princes
3. Cavalry Captain Princes (မြင်းမှူးမင်းသား, Myinhmu Mintha) – The third grade of non-royal princes

Princely titles were granted based on the prince's rank (of which there were 12 total), which divided into three grades, as follows (in order of precedence):

1. Dhammarājā (ဓမ္မရာဇာ) – usually suffixed to the prince's title.
  - First rank – granted a title of 10 syllables
  - Second rank – granted a title of 9 syllables
  - Third rank – granted a title of 8 syllables
  - Fourth rank – granted a title of 6 syllables
2. Thado (သတိုး) – usually prefixed to the prince's title.
  - Fifth rank – granted a title of 8 syllables
  - Sixth rank – granted a title of 6 syllables
  - Seventh rank – granted a title of 5 syllables
  - Eighth rank – granted a title of 3 syllables
3. Minye (မင်းရဲ) – usually prefixed to the prince's title.
  - Ninth rank – granted a title of 7 syllables
  - Tenth rank – granted a title of 6 syllables
  - Eleventh rank – granted a title of 4 syllables
  - Twelfth rank – granted a title of 3 syllables

=== Princesses ===
The ranks of the King's daughters were determined by the rank of their mothers. These ranks in order of precedence were as follows:

1. Hteik Suhpaya (ထိပ်စုဖုရား) – The daughters of the King by his queens
2. Hteik Hkaungtin (ထိပ်ခေါင်တင်) – The unmarried daughters of the King, by his minor consorts
3. Hteik Hta Mibaya (ထိပ်ထား မိဖုရား) – The married daughters of the King, by his junior wives

The Crown Princess in line to become chief queen, specially designated to wed the Crown Prince was known as the Tabindaing Minthami (တစ်ပင်တိုင် မင်းသမီး) or as the Einshe Hteik Hta Mibaya (အိမ်ရှေ့ထိပ်ထား မိဖုရား).

=== Ranking officials ===
High-ranking court officials (အမတ်, amat) were also ranked into 9 ranks, representing their place at the Great Audience Hall during obeisance ceremonies (gadaw), as follows (in order of precedence):

1. Sitthugyi (စစ်သူကြီး) – commander-in-chief
2. Neyalutne (နေရာလွတ်နေ, lit. 'those without place') - dignitaries above rank, including the tributary princes (saophas and myosas)
3. Sawbwagyi Naukne (စော်ဘွားကြီး နောက်နေ, lit. 'those behind the saophas')
4. Tawchun (တော်ချွန်)
5. Taw (တော်)
6. Du (ဒူး)
7. Sani (စနည်း)
8. Atwin Bawaw (အတွင်းဘဝေါ)
9. Apyin Bawaw (အပြင်ဘဝေါ)

Said officials also received 11 types of titles commensurate with their rank, as follows (in order of precedence):

1. Thado (သတိုး), from Sanskrit satviva shaktidhara (သတွိဝ + ၐက္တိဓရ)
2. Mingyi (မင်းကြီး)
3. Mahā (မဟာ, Pali 'great')
4. Min Thon Hsin Bwe (မင်း၃ဆင့်ဘွဲ့) - title containing three Min (မင်း)
5. Min Hna Hsin Bwe (မင်း၂ဆင့်ဘွဲ့) - title containing two Min (မင်း)
6. Min Ta Hsin Bwe (မင်း၁ဆင့်ဘွဲ့) - title containing one Min (မင်း)
7. Nemyo Min (နေမျိုးမင်း)
8. Nemyo (နေမျိုး, Burmese 'solar race')
9. Nawrahta (နော်ရထာ)
10. Shwedaung (ရွှေတောင်)
11. Ordinary titles

The wives of some high-ranking officials also received rank, as follows (in order of precedence):

1. Amaydawkhan Gadawgyi (အမေတော်ခံကတော်ကြီး)
2. Gadaw (ကတော်)
3. Shethwe (ရှေ့သွယ်)
4. Naukthwe (နောက်သွယ်)
5. Pwetet Neya (ပွဲတက်နေရာ)
6. Lethsaungdaw Thein Thami Kanya (လက်ဆောင်တော် သိမ်းသမီး ကညာ)

== See also ==
- Burmese Buddhist titles
- Konbaung Dynasty

== Sources ==
- "EAlang Library Burmese Dictionary". Myanmar–English Dictionary. Myanmar Language Commission. 1993. ISBN 1-881265-47-1.
- Aung-Thwin, Michael (1984). "Hierarchy and Order in Pre-Colonial Burma". Journal of Southeast Asian Studies. 15 (2). Cambridge University Press: 225. doi:10.1017/s0022463400012467. JSTOR 20070590. S2CID 159929431.
- Hla Pe (1985). Burma: Literature, Historiography, Scholarship, Language, Life, and Buddhism. Institute of Southeast Asian Studies. ISBN 9789971988005.
- Koenig, William J. (1990). The Burmese Polity, 1752-1819. Center for South and Southeast Asian Studies. ISBN 9780891480570.
- Lieberman, Victor B. (1980). "The Transfer of the Burmese Capital from Pegu to Ava". The Journal of the Royal Asiatic Society of Great Britain and Ireland. 1 (1). Royal Asiatic Society of Great Britain and Ireland: 66. JSTOR 25211086.
- Pho Hlaing (2004). ရာဇဓမ္မသင်္ဂဟကျမ် [Rajadhammasangaha] (PDF). Translated by L.E. Bagshawe.
- Scott, J. George (1900). Gazetteer of Upper Burma and the Shan States. Vol. 2. Rangoon: Superintendent, Government Printing, Burma.
- Yi Yi (1982). "Life at the Burmese Court under the Konbaung Kings" (PDF). Silver Jubilee Publication. Burma: Historical Research Department: 100–147. Archived from the original (PDF) on 2016-03-04.
