= Naga, Prince of Pyinzi =

Burmese royal prince

Prince Naga

Prince of Pyinzi
- Reign: 1784 – 1855
- Predecessor: Shwe Aing
- Successor: Myosit
- Born: Naga; 1771; Ava
- Died: 1855 (aged 83–84); Mandalay
- consort: Min Shwenga
- House: Konbaung
- Father: Hsinbyushin
- Mother: Thanlyin Mibaya

Minye Thihakyaw (Burmese: မင်းရဲသီဟကျော်, born Naga; 1771 – 1855), commonly known as the Prince of Pyinzi, was a royal prince of Burma's Konbaung dynasty, especially renowned for his composition of classical songs (or Mahāgīta).

== Life ==
Maung Naga was born to King Hsinbyushin and Thanlyin Mibaya in 1771. Because he received the appanage of Pyinzi, along with the title of Minye Thihakyaw in 1784, Maung Naga was known in life as the "Prince of Pyinzi." He married Min Shwenga, a daughter of King Hsinbyushin and Ratanadevi. Maung Naga died in 1855. He was the uncle of the third Pyinzi Prince, Myo Sit, who succeeded him in his princedom.

== Works ==
Among the five Pyinzi princes of the Konbaung dynasty, those who showed the most interest in Mahāgīta were Maung Naga and Hteiktin Pu. Although they both composed Mahāgīta songs, no Mahagita books described clearly which songs were written by which Prince of Pyinzi.

Following the 1789 royal order of Crown Prince Shwedaung, many professionals translated Thai and Khmer legends into Burmese with the help of ambassadors from the Ayutthaya Kingdom and the Khmer Empire. The translated Burmese versions were entitled Yama Zatdaw, Indrāvudha, Kesāsīri, and Sinkhapatta.

Maung Naga composed lyrics for eight chapters of the Yama Zatdaw:

- ShweTanayar (ရွှေတညာ)
- Hninyunkhar Heman (နှင်းယွန်းခါဟေမာန်)
- Taw Taungswe (တောတောင်စွယ်)
- Taw Myaing Chay Lan (တောမြိုင်ခြေ လမ်း)
- Pan Myaing Le (ပန်းမြိုင်လယ်)
- Khaing Pan Sone (ခိုင်ပန်းစုံ)
- Hmawyon Hewun (မှော်ရုံဟေဝန်)
- Hmine Hmon Pyar Nyo (မှိုင်းမှုန်ပြာညို).

In 1841 King Tharrawaddy went to Yangon together with Maung Naga. There he composed Mon songs:

- Taungyan Tawgyi (တောင်ယံတောကြီး)
- Taungyan Tawgale (တောင်ယံတောကလေး)
- Hninyun Gimman (နှင်းယွန်းဂိမ္မာန်)
- Hninyunthar Heman (နှင်းယွန်းသာဟေမန်)
- Kaunggyi Thinkar (ကောင်းကြီးသင်ခါ)
- Hnyin Hnyin Pansin Shwe Tamyar (ညှင်းညှင်းပဉ္စင် ရွှေတံမြွာ)
- Sein Mya Yan Chal (စိန်မြရံချယ်)
- Thaung Kyay Dipabwe (သောင်းကျေးဒီပါဘွေ).

Maung Naga composed Yintkyu Waemandar and Yuzana Malar patpyoes.
