= Myo Sit =

Burmese prince of the Konbaung Dynasty

- Prince of Pyinzi
- Reign: c. 1776 – 1781
- Born: 18th century Ava
- Died: 1781; Ava
Names
- Maung Myo Sit
- House: Konbaung dynasty
- Father: King Singu
- Mother: Thiri Maha Nanda Devi
- Religion: Theravāda Buddhism

Myo Sit (Burmese: မျိုးစစ်) was a Burmese royal prince of the Konbaung dynasty, known as the third Pyinzi Prince among the five who held the Pyinzi Prince title during the 18th century.

He was a son of King Singu by the Queen of the Central Palace, Thiri Maha Nanda Devi, and a nephew of the second Pyinzi Prince, Prince Naga, Prince of Pyinzi. Myo Sit was granted the appanage of Pyinzi by his father and was therefore known as the Pyinzi Prince. He had one daughter and one son, although his daughter died young. In 1781, after King Bodawpaya ascended the throne by coup, Myo Sit, along with his father King Hsinbyushin, was deposed and executed.
