= Prince of Pyinzi =

Hereditary appanage of Pyinzi

Prince of Pyinzi (Burmese: ပြင်စည်မင်းသား; also Duke of Pyinzi) was a hereditary title in Burma given to the royal prince who was granted the appanage of Pyinzi as liege-lord or myosa, which is equivalent to a duke.

Of the five princes who received the appanage of Pyinzi during the Konbaung dynasty, three were sons of monarchs and two, Prince Shwe Aing and Prince Pu, were royal relatives. Prince Naga, Prince Pu and Prince Thado Minye died during the reign of a single king – King Mindon.

King Bagyidaw also governed Pyinzi as one of his appanages when he was the crown prince.

Prince Naga and Prince Pu showed interest in the Mahāgīta (a collection of classical songs) and are frequently discussed in academic circles. Although they both composed Mahāgīta songs, no evidence survives to indicate which songs were written by whom.

== Prince Shwe Aing ==
Prince Shwe Aing was born to Minye Thinkathu Maung Pyay, the Prince of Kyauksauk (a son of Alaungpaya's younger brother Maung Shwe Ya and Khin Wa), and Khin Ama (a daughter of Minhla Kyawthu the Major of Ava). He was known as the First Pyinzi Prince.

== Prince Naga (1771 – 1855) ==
Prince Naga, known as the Second Pyinzi Prince, was born to King Hsinbyushin and Thanlyin Mibaya and married Min Shwenga, a daughter of King Hsinbyushin and Queen Ratanadevi. He was famous for writing lyrics for eight chapters of the Yama Zatdaw, a Burmese version of Ramayana translated from Siamese in 1789.

== Prince Myosit ==
Born to King Singu and the Queen of the Middle Palace, Prince Myosit, the Third Pyinzi Prince, was a nephew of Prince Naga, the Second Pyinzi Prince. Along with his father, he was executed by Bodawpaya in 1782.

== Prince Pu (1813 – 1862) ==
Prince Pu was a son of the Prince of Toungoo, a younger brother of King Bagyidaw, and the Princess of Tagaung, and was known as the Fourth Pyinzi Prince. "Myan Char Mye Ko", a patpyoe, is one of his classical compositions. His two daughters were also writers, following in their father's footsteps.

== Prince Thado Minye ==
Receiving the appanage of Pyinzi after the death of Prince Pu in 1862, a son of King Mindon and the first Queen of the Northern Apartment, Thado Minye became known as the Fifth Pyinzi Prince. He was a victim of the Myingun Myinkhondaing rebellion which broke out in 1866.

== See also ==
- Pyinzi Supaya
