= Konbaung tombs =

Collection of mausoleums built by Konbaung dynasty kings

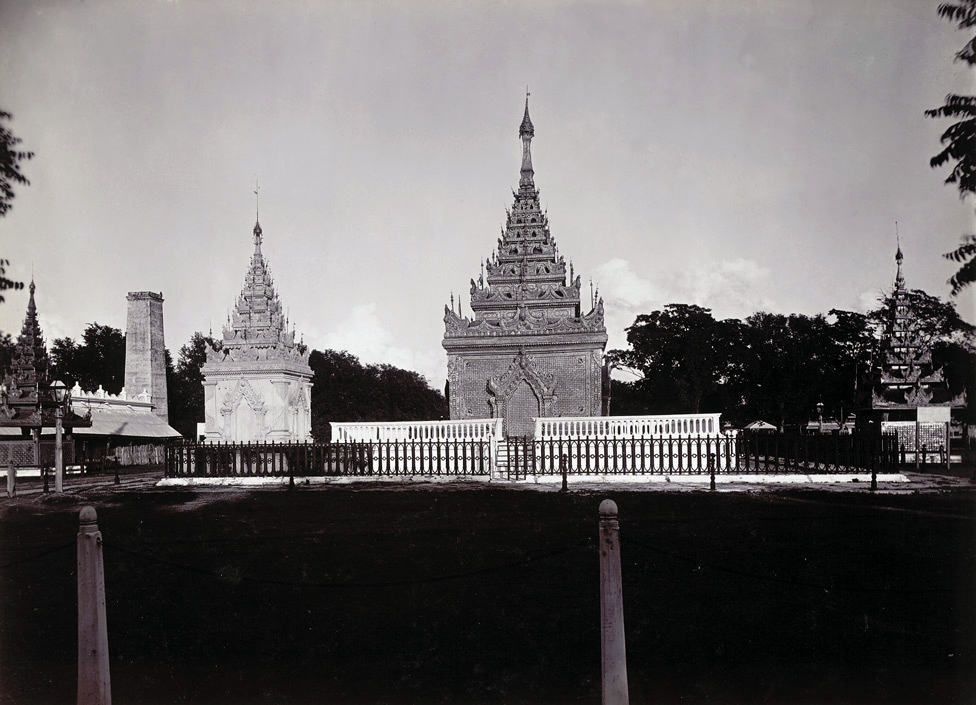
The tomb of King Mindon on the grounds of Mandalay Palace in 1903.

The Konbaung tombs are a collection of mausoleums built by Konbaung dynasty kings. They are scattered throughout the former royal capitals of Mandalay Region, including Mandalay, Amarapura, and Inwa.

== Burial traditions ==
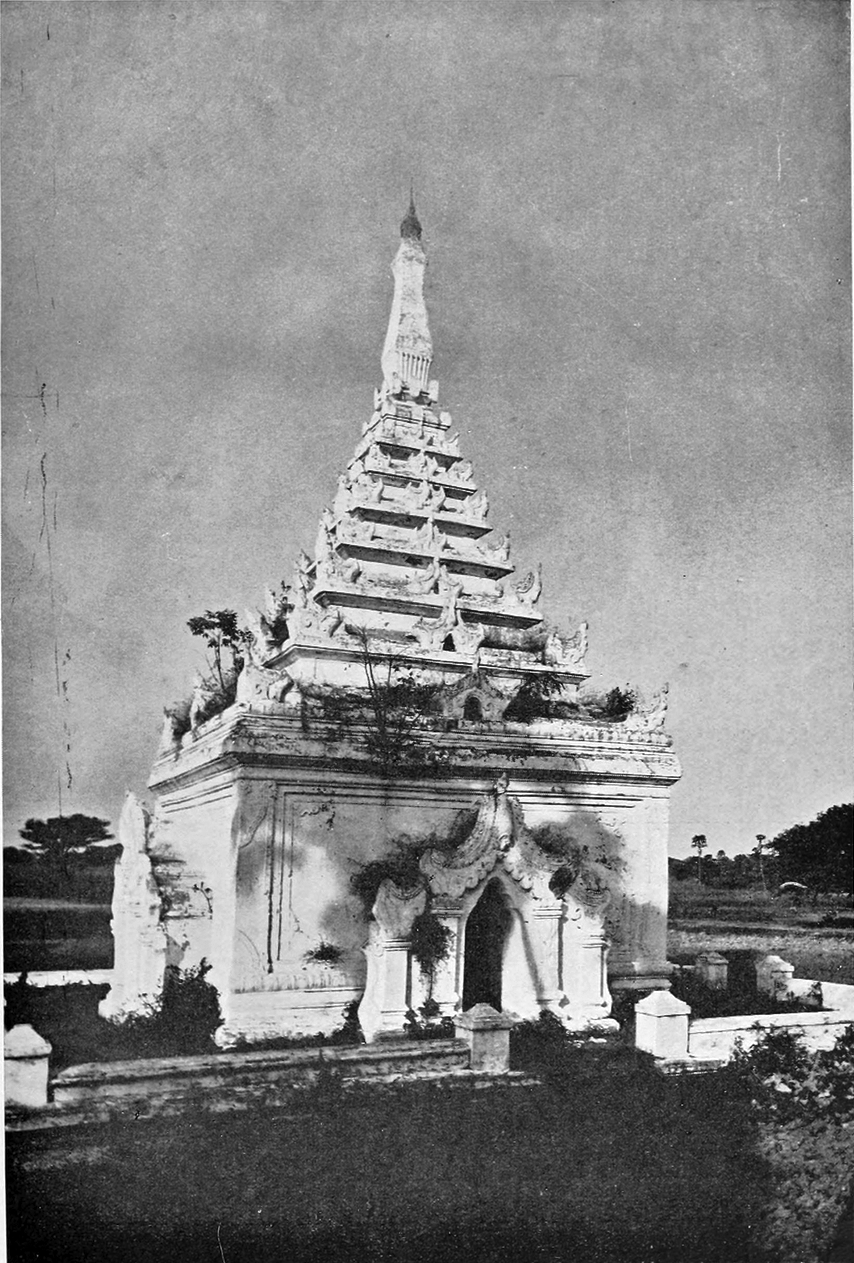
Tomb of King Bagyidaw in Amarapura.

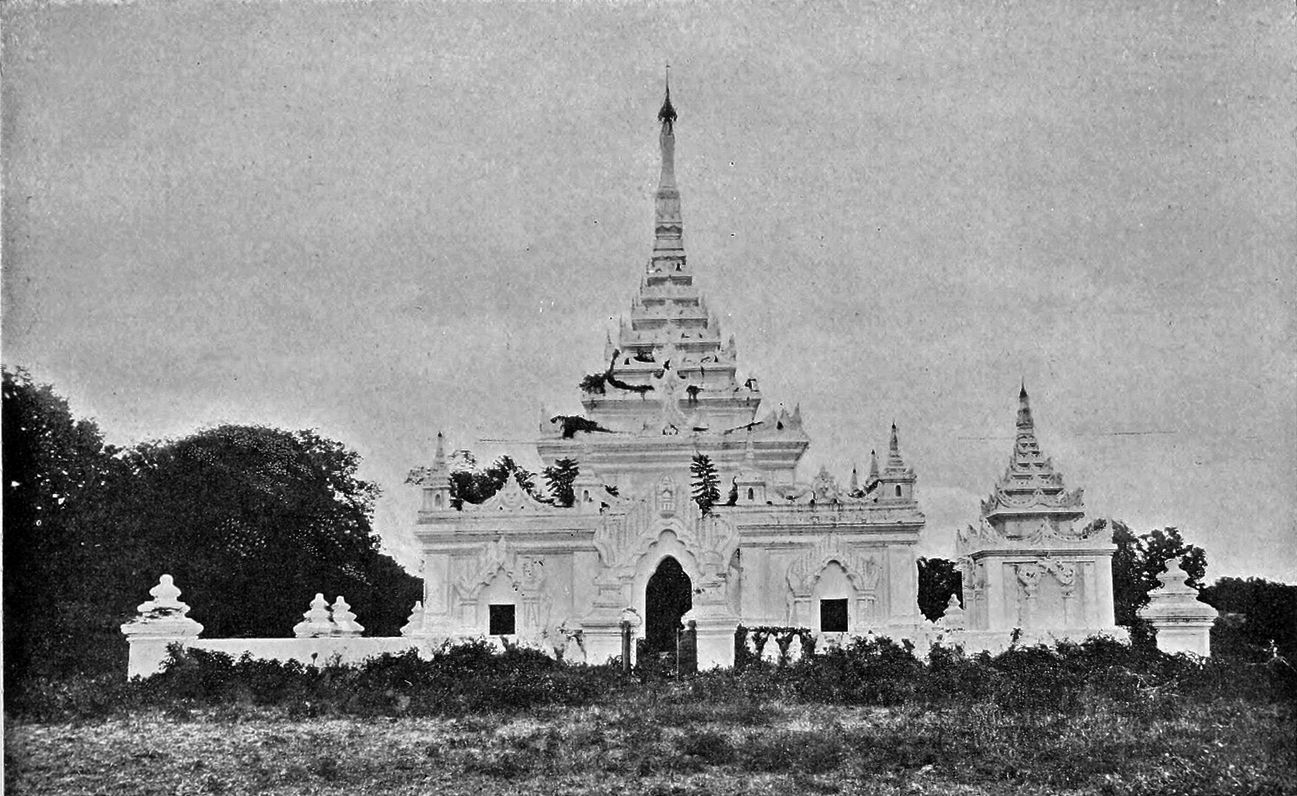
Tomb of King Bodawpaya in Amarapura.

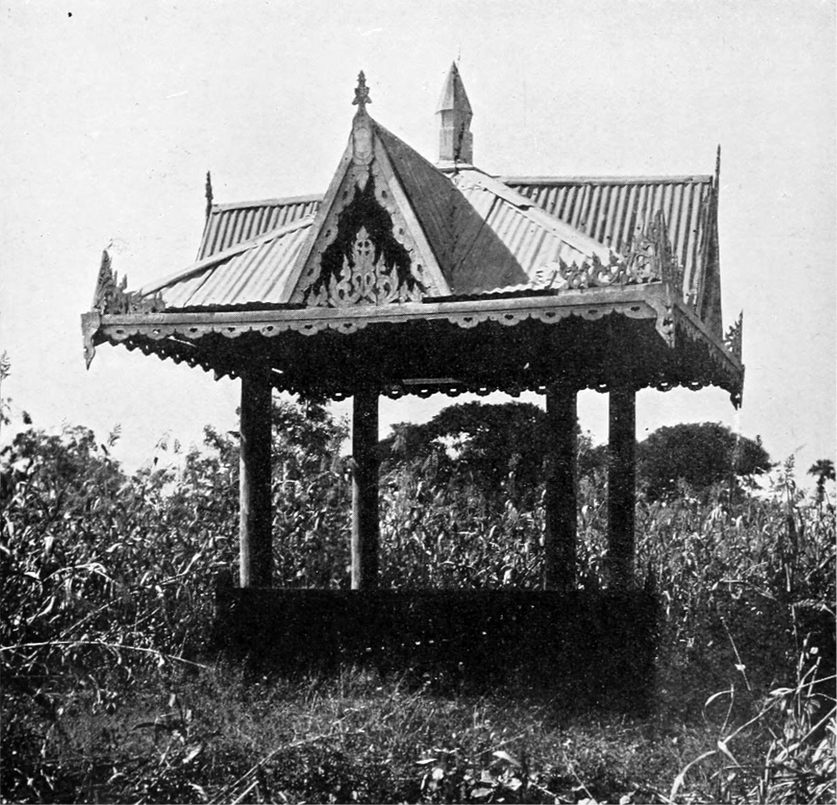
Tomb of Shwebo Min.

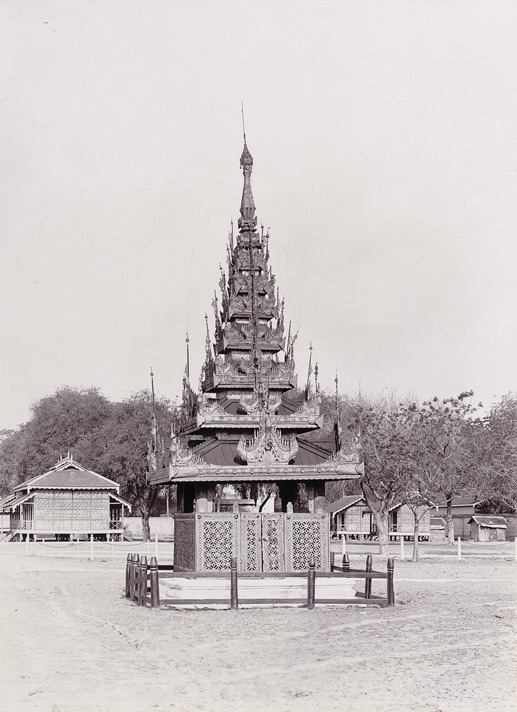
Tomb of Laungshe Queen.

When a Burmese king died, his royal white umbrella was broken and the great drum and gong at the palace's bell tower (at the eastern gate of the palace), was struck. It was custom for members of the royal family, including the king, to be cremated: their ashes were put into a velvet bag and thrown into the river. King Mindon Min was the first to break tradition; his remains were not cremated, but instead were buried intact, according to his wishes, at the place where his tomb now stands. Before his burial, the King Mindon's body was laid in state before his throne at the Hmannandawgyi (Palace of Mirrors).

== List of tombs ==
=== Amarapura ===
1. Tomb of King Bodawphaya (Amarapura 21°54′46″N 96°04′31″E) – King Bodawpaya reigned from 1781 to 1810, i.e., for 38 years. His was the longest reign among the kings of the Konbaung dynasty. He is remembered in history as the builder of the gigantic Mingun Pagoda, to which he dedicated a huge bell, which is the second largest in the world. His body was burnt on the site of the so-called "tomb," and the ashes were placed in a velvet bag and thrown into the Irrawaddy River.
2. Tomb of King Bagyidaw (Amarapura 21°54′41″N 96°04′05″E) – Bagyidaw was a grandson of Bodawpaya, being the son and heir of the Einshemin, who conquered Arakan in 1784 and brought away to Amarapura the celebrated Mahamuni image, the palladium of the Rakhine people. Bagyidaw was under the influence of Nanmadaw Me Nu, his notorious chief queen and her brother Minthagyi Maung O, through whose intrigues and machinations the First Anglo-Burmese War broke out in 1824. He reigned from 1819 to 1837. His body was cremated on the site of his "tomb" and the ashes were thrown into the Irrawaddy River.
3. Tomb of King Tharrawaddy Min (Amarapura 21°55′06″N 96°04′16″E) – Shwebo Min was the father of Kings Pagan and Mindon, and reigned from 1837 to 1846. He rebelled against his brother, Bagyidaw, and deposed him. His body was cremated on the site of his "tomb" and the ashes were thrown into the Irrawadd River. A wooden structure with a corrugated iron roof was constructed over the tomb. The structure was dismantled and replaced with a masonry pyatthat at a cost of 1,183 rupees.
4. Tomb of King Mindon's mother (Amarapura) – Erected in 1852. The old queen died just before the accession of her son, who was the wisest ruler of the Konbaung dynasty.

=== Mandalay ===
1. Tomb of King Mindon Min (21°59′38″N 96°05′55″E) – King Mindon died in 1878. He was the tenth of the Konbaung dynasty, which was founded in 1753. Before he died, he left instructions that his body should be buried and not cremated, thus violating the time-honoured custom of burning the dead bodies of the members of the royal family. The mausoleum erected over his remains within the Mandalay Palace enclosure is a good specimen of Burmese work in glass mosaic.
2. Tomb of Queen Hsinbyumashin – Hsinbyumashin, the only daughter of the notorious Nanmadaw Me Nu, chief queen of King Bagyidaw, was the second queen of Mindon and mother-in-law of Thibaw. She died at Rangoon in 1900, and her body was permitted to be buried near Mindon's tomb.
3. Tomb of Medawgyi, mother-in-law of Mindon (21°59′39″N 96°05′55″E) – Medawgyi, mother-in-law of Mindon, was the mother of King Pagan. She died in 1874.
4. Tomb of Nanmadawgyi (21°59′39″N 96°05′55″E) – Nanmadawgyi, daughter of Medawgyi referred to in No 4, was the chief queen of Mindon. She was a wise princess and was learned especially in history and astrology, and was the constant adviser of her husband. She died in 1876 and was buried in the palace stockade. Her tomb was the third erected within the sacred precincts of the palace, the first being that of the Myauknandaw Queen, the favourite wife of King Mindon, and the second being No. 4.
5. Tomb of Medawgyi (Laungshe Queen (21°59′39″N 96°05′55″E)), Queen of Mindon – The Laungshe Mibaya was a queen of Mindon and mother of King Thibaw. She was of Shan extraction, being a descendant of a daughter of the Sawbwa of Thibaw (Hsipaw). As queen dowager she enjoyed some power, and a White House was built for her residence. She died in 1881, that is, three years after the accession of her son.

=== Shwebo ===
1. Tomb of King Alaungpaya – His remains were interred at Shwebo. In 1898, a wooden pyatthat was erected over his tomb, and a marble tombstone was laid on the tomb at a cost of 833 rupees.

== Ratnagiri ==
1. Tomb of King Thibaw – His remains are interred at a tomb in Ratnagiri, along with his second consort, Supayagalay. Descendants of the royal family announced in April 2017 to plan a mausoleum for Thibaw at Mandalay Palace.

== Yangon ==
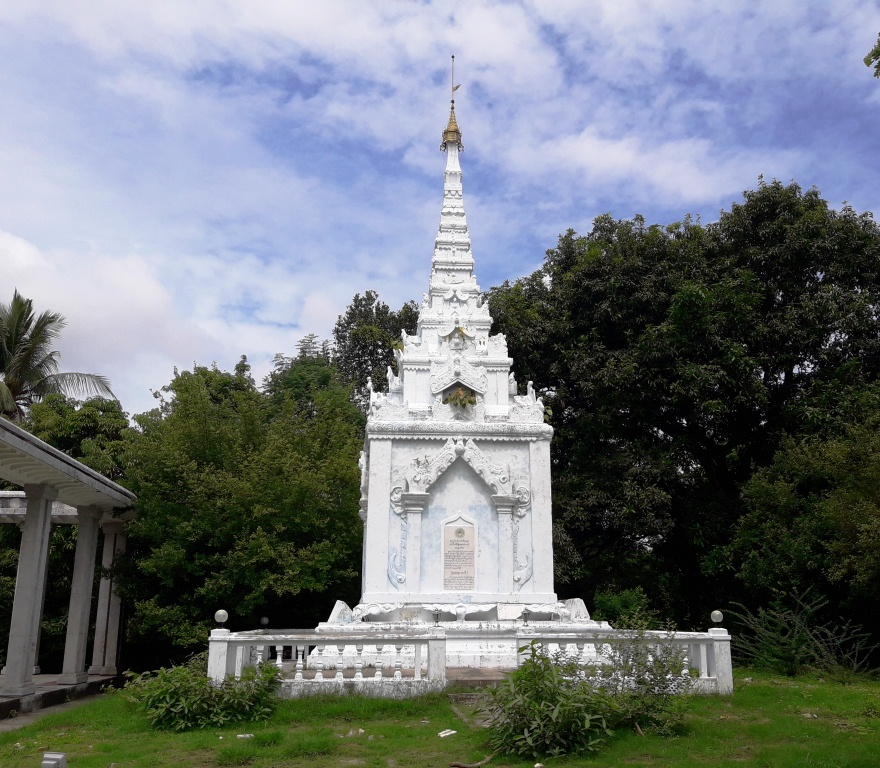
Supayalat's mausoleum

1. Tomb of Queen Supayalat (16°47′34″N 96°09′03″E) – Her remains are interred in a mausoleum at the Kandawmin Garden Mausolea in Yangon.
