= Hteiktin Pu, Prince of Pyinzi =

Hteiktin Pu

Prince of Pyinzi
- Reign: circa 1855 – 1882
- Predecessor: Myosit
- Successor: Thado Minye

Prince of Myingun
- Born: c. 1813; Ava
- Died: 1882 (aged 68–69); Mandalay
- Issue: Hteiktin Wint; Hteiktin Kyi; Hteiktin Nyo
- House: Konbaung
- Father: Prince of Toungoo
- Mother: Princess of Tagaung

Hteiktin Pu (Burmese: ထိပ်တင်ပု, c. 1813 – 1882), commonly known as Prince of Pyinzi, was a royal prince during the late Konbaung dynasty in Burma, especially famous for composing classical Mahāgīta songs.

== Biography ==
Hteiktin Pu was born in about 1813 to the Prince of Toungoo, a younger brother of King Bagyidaw, (Note: Bodawpaya's son, Crown Prince of Shwedaung and his first consort gave birth to four sons and five daughters– Bagyidaw, Prince of Toungoo, Tharrawaddy, Bo Lamin (died at young age), Min Myatsoe, Min Myatsu, a daughter (died at young age), Min Akyi (died at young age), and Min Ange.) and Princess of Tagaung.

Hteiktin Pu received the appanage of Myingun with the title of Maha Siri Dhammaraja during the reign of King Tharrawaddy, and the appanage of Pyinzi (Note: Pyinzi is a town on the Myingyan–Taungtha roadside.) with the title of Su Siri Maha Dhammaraja during King Mindon.

Hteiktin Pu died in 1882.

== Works ==
Among the five Pyinzi princes of the Konbaung dynasty, those who showed the most interest in Mahāgīta were Maung Naga and Hteiktin Pu. Although they both composed Mahāgīta songs, no Mahagita books described clearly which songs were written by which Prince of Pyinzi.

The famous Mahāgīta songs Hteiktin Pu composed were:

- Myan Char Mye Ko patpyoe (မြန်ချာမြေကို ပတ်ပျိုး)
- Celebration song of Mandalay started with Mingalar Thiri Mye Myatswa (မင်္ဂလာသီရိမြေမြတ်စွာ အစချီ မန္တလေးမြို့ဘွဲ့)
- Taung Zambu Paing Thai-adapted song (တောင်ဇမ္ဗူပိုင် ယိုးဒယား)
- Wei Zayantar Nanbon Thai-adapted song (ဝေဇယန္တာနန်းဘုံ ယိုးဒယား).

== Issue ==
Hteiktin Pu had three children: Hteiktin Wint, Hteiktin Kyi and Hteiktin Nyo.

King Mindon conferred the title of Minye Thinkayar to Hteiktin Wint in 1882.

Hteiktin Kyi followed her father's footsteps— she also composed Mahagita songs. There were Hteiktin Kyi's eight patpyoes in "Sabba Gitakkama Pasānadī" manuscript.

Hteiktin Nyo published the novel "Dadhivāhana and Pāsādacandi" Volume I in 1906 and Volume II in 1908.
