= Princess Meiktila =

Thiri Thuriya Yazawadi
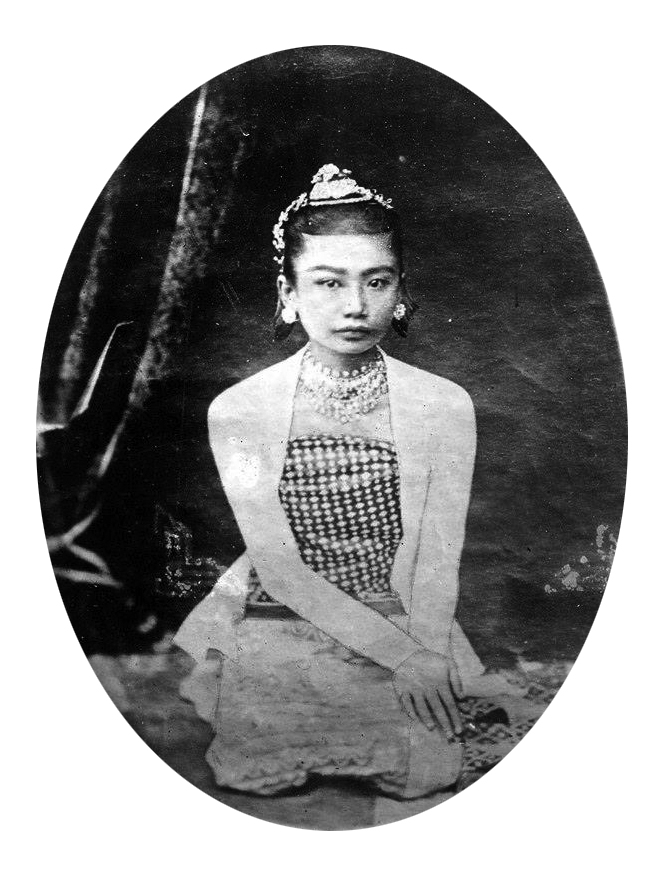

Princess of Meikhtila
- Born: 1860; Mandalay
- Died: 1 June 1896 (aged 35–36); Mandalay, British Burma
- Burial: Mandalay Palace
- Spouse: Kyaw Hlaing Maung Maung
- Issue: 3 daughters, 1 son
- House: Konbaung
- Father: Mindon Min
- Mother: Laungshe Mibaya
- Religion: Theravada Buddhism

Thiri Thuriya Yazawadi (Burmese: သီရိသူရိယရာဇာဝတီ; Pali: Sīrisūriyarājāvatī; 1860 – 1 June 1896), commonly known as the Princess of Meikhtila or Meikhtila Supaya Galay (Burmese: မိတ္ထီလာစုဘုရားကလေး), was a royal princess of Burma (Myanmar) during the Konbaung dynasty. She was born in 1860 at the Mandalay Palace, the daughter of Mindon Min by his consort, Laungshe Mibaya. Her full siblings included two sisters, the Princess of Maing Kaing, Princess of Pakhangyi, and one elder brother, Thibaw Min.

She was granted the appanages of Meiktila and Pyaungpya on 20 October 1878. After the fall of the Konbaung dynasty in 1885, the princess, then 26, relocated out of the Mandalay Palace. She ultimately wed Kyaw Hlaing Maung Maung, the brother of her handmaiden, Khin Lay Pu. The couple had 3 daughters and 1 son. She died on 1 June 1896, shortly after the death of her son.
