= Magway Mibaya =

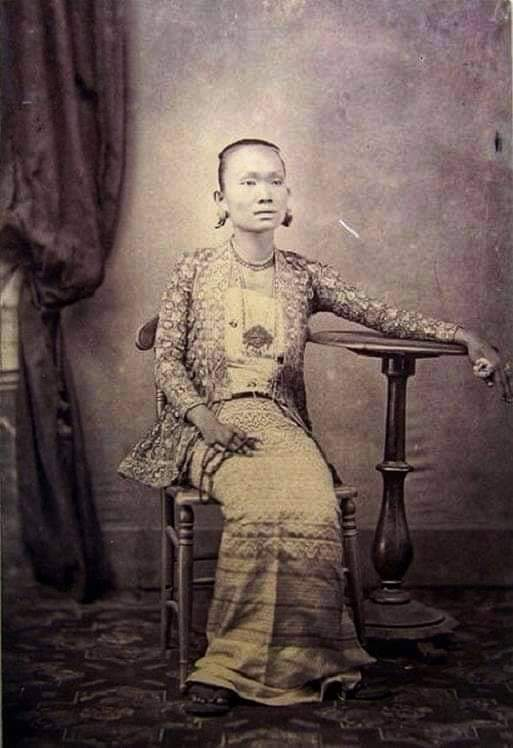
- Magway Mibaya

Myosa of Magway
- Tenure: 1854–?

Princess of Taungtha
- King: King Tharrawaddy
- Born: Khin Min Kauk unknown Ava
- Died: 1888
- Spouse: Mindon Min
- Issue: Legaing Mintha; Mingin Supaya; Pyinzi Supaya
Regnal name
- Thiri Mahar Thu Mingalar Sandar Dewi
- House: Konbaung
- Father: Tharrawaddy Min
- Mother: Kyapin Mibaya
- Religion: Theravada Buddhism

Thiri Mahar Thu Mingalar Sandar Dewi (Burmese: သီရိမဟာ သုမင်္ဂလာ စန္ဒာဒေဝီ; Pali: Sīrimahā sumaṅgalā candādevī), commonly known as Magway Mibaya (Burmese: မကွေးမိဖုရား), was a senior queen consort of King Mindon during the late Konbaung dynasty.

She was a daughter of King Tharrawaddy and his consort Kyapin Mibaya. She was a Princess of Taungtha during the reign of her father. Being a half-sister of King Mindon, she was promoted to a Nanzwe Mibaya (Note: King Mindon created a special position called Nanzwe Mibaya for his four queens– Yinge Mibaya, Laungshe Mibaya, Magway Mibaya and Seindon Mibaya. It's between Nanya Mibaya (first rank) and Ahsaungya Mibaya (second rank).) and received the appanage of Magway when he ascended the throne.

King Mindon and Magway Mibaya gave birth to Mingin Supaya and Pyinzi Supaya.

She was not compatible with the Queen of the Central Palace Hsinbyumashin. After securing permission from King Mindon, to avoid the beset caused by Hsinbyumashin faction in the palace, she relinquished her insignia of Mibaya to leave the palace and married an ordinary merchant.

== See also ==
- Konbaung dynasty
- List of Burmese consorts
