= Mingin Supaya =

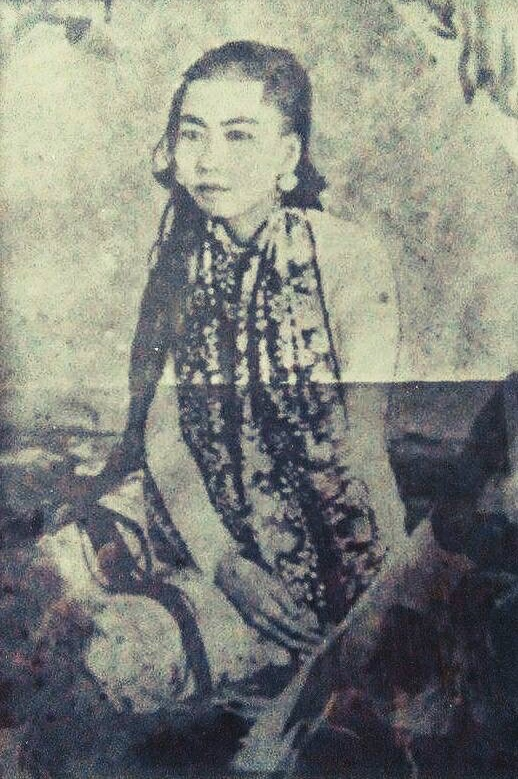

Princess of Mingin
- Reign: April 1861 - 22 April 1883

Princess of Lègaing
- Reign: 1858 – April 1861
- Predecessor: Lègaing Mintha (died on 8 February 1858)
- Born: Mandalay Palace
- Died: 1884; Mandalay
Regnal name
- Thiri Thu Yadana Dewi
- House: Konbaung
- Father: King Mindon
- Mother: Magway Mibaya
- Religion: Theravada Buddhism

Thiri Thu Yadana Dewi (Burmese: သီရိသုရတနာဒေဝီ, Pali: Sīrisuratanādevī), commonly known as Princess of Mingin or Mingin Supaya, was a high-ranking Burmese royal princess during the late Konbaung dynasty.

== Life ==
Thiri Thu Yadana Wadi (later promoted to Thiri Thu Yadana Dewi) was born to King Mindon and Magway Mibaya at Mandalay Palace. She, at first, received the appanage of Lè Gaing which was replaced with the town of Mingin in April 1861. The ear-boring ceremony (နားထွင်းမင်္ဂလာ) for Mingin Supaya was held on 6 February 1868. After King Thibaw ascended the throne, she, along with other princesses, was administered to take an oath of loyalty on 18 November 1878.

Mingin Supaya, together with Momeik Princess, was granted an opportunity to feed Hteik Su Myat Phaya Gyi (first daughter of King Thibaw and Queen Supayalat) at her royal cradling ceremony (ပုခက်တင်မင်္ဂလာ) held on 22 February 1883.

== Death ==
Mingin Supaya was found guilty of having sexual relationship with a man named Nga Tu and was ordered to be imprisoned for violating social taboos concerning sex on 22 April 1883. On the following day, her family and its servants were sent as slaves to Man Aung Yadana Wakhingone Pagoda. On 25 April 1883, at sayadaws' request, she was sentenced in jail, and others were set free but remained under house arrest until the abdication of King Thibaw in 1885.

Mingin Supaya was executed on 26 April 1884 at 6:00 pm.

== Bibliography ==
- Maung Maung Tin, U (October 2004). Konbaung Set Maha Yazawindawgyi (Chronicle of Konbaung Dynasty) (in Burmese). Vol. 3 (4th ed.). Yangon: Department of Universities History Research, University of Yangon.
