= Laungshe Mibaya =

Thiri Mahamingala Thupabadewi Sirimahāmaṅgalasupabhādevī
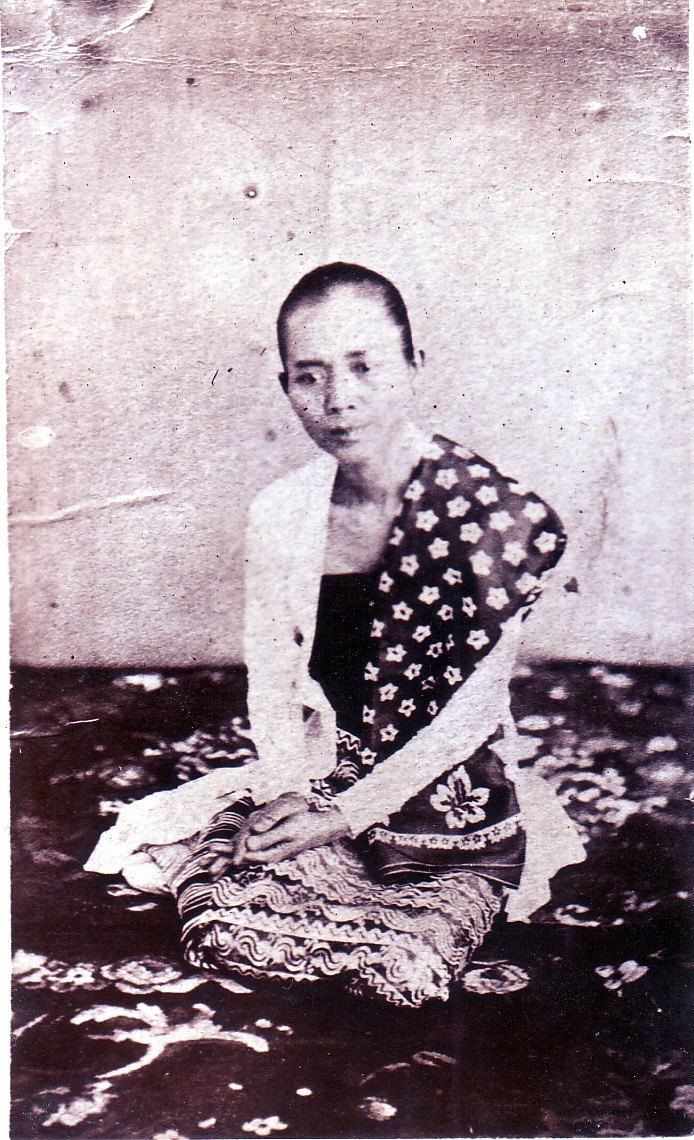

Queen Dowager of Burma
- Tenure: 1878–1881
- Successor: none
- Born: 1825; Ava
- Died: after 1890; Shan State
- Burial: Mandalay Palace
- Spouse: Mindon Min
- Issue: Mong Kung Princess; Pakhangyi Princess; Thibaw Min; Meiktila Princess
- House: Konbaung
- Father: Maung Mey
- Mother: Shin U
- Religion: Theravada Buddhism

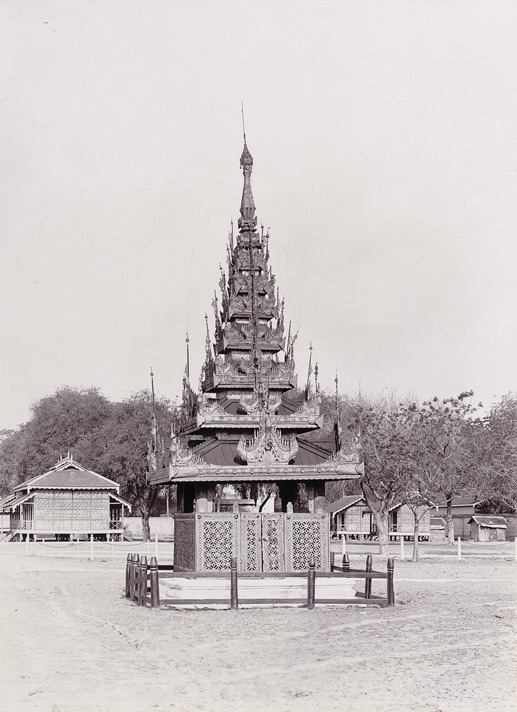
Tomb of Laungshe Queen.

Thiri Mahamingala Thupabadewi (Burmese: သီရိမဟာမင်္ဂလာသုပဘာဒေဝီ; Pali: Sirimahāmaṅgalasupabhādevī; 1825 – after 1890), commonly known as the Laungshe Mibaya or Queen of Laungshe (Burmese: လောင်းရှည် မိဖုရား), was a Burmese royal princess and senior queen consort of King Mindon during the Konbaung dynasty. She was the queen mother of the Konbaung dynasty's last king, Thibaw Min. Being a cousin of King Mindon, she was promoted to a Nanzwe Mibaya (Note: King Mindon created a special position called Nanzwe Mibaya for his four queens– Yinge Mibaya, Laungshe Mibaya, Magway Mibaya and Seindon Mibaya. It's between Nanya Mibaya (first rank) and Ahsaungya Mibaya (second rank).) and received the appanage of Laungshe when he ascended the throne.

Her other children included 3 daughters, the Mong Kung Princess, Pakhangyi Princess, Meiktila Princess.

She was of Shan extraction, it's seems her grandmother by her father name "Kham Ing" is a daughter of the Sawbwa of Thibaw (Hsipaw). As Queen Dowager she enjoyed some power and a White House was built for her residence. However the Madalay's chronicle reported she died on 1 June 1881 which is fake news for political reasons, but by reality she died no evidence exists but after 1890 there are still photograph of her living in the palace of Sawbwa of Loikaw in Shan State in those era, which nowadays is in Kayah State.

== Family ==
- Issue
1. Mong Kung Princess (1853 – 1862)
2. Pakhangyi Princess (1858 – 1911)
3. Thibaw Min (1859 – 1916)
4. Meiktila Princess (1860 – 1896)

== See also ==
- Konbaung dynasty
- Mindon Min
