= Mount Taung Wine =

Mountain in Myanmar

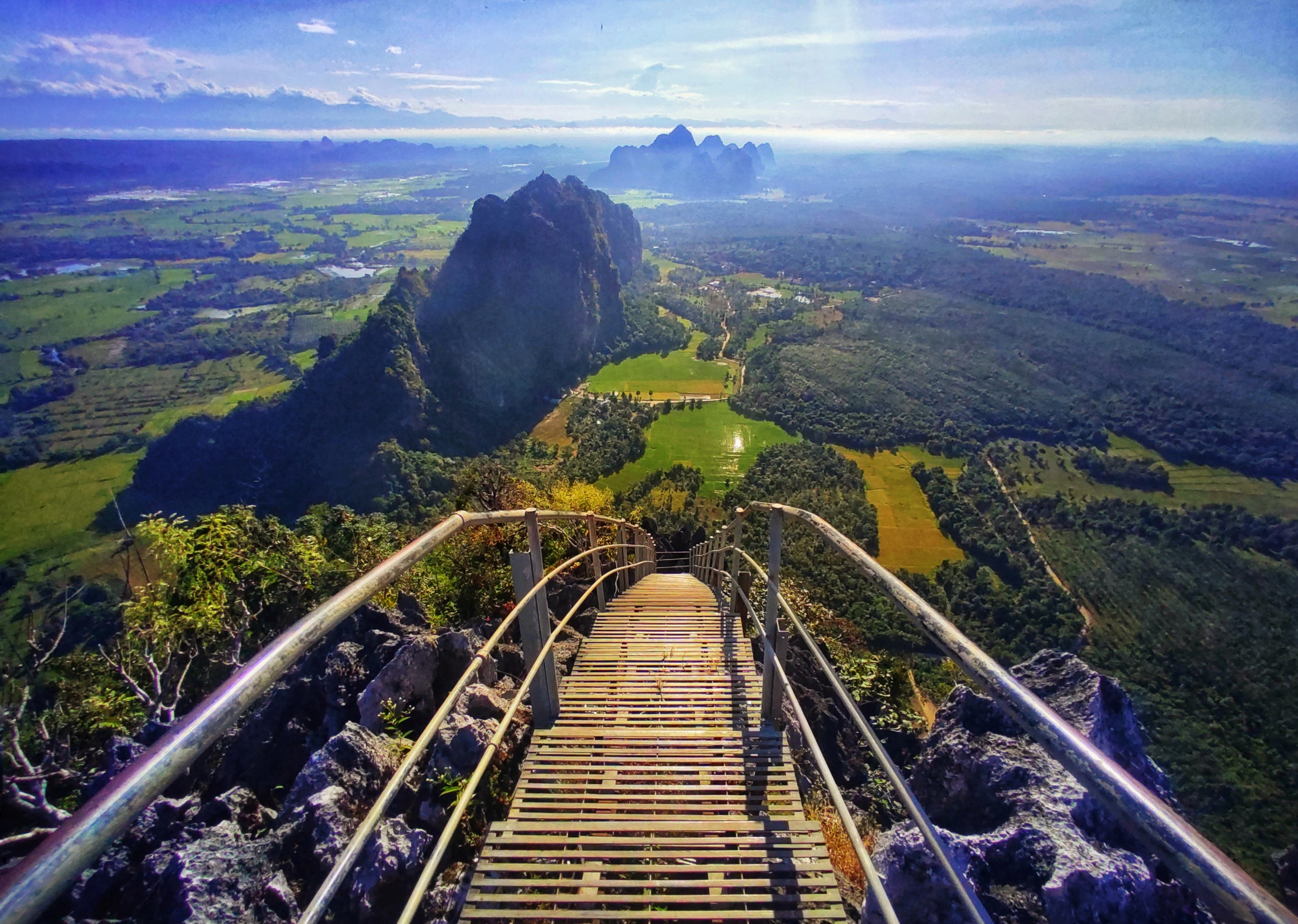
- View from the top of Mount Taung Wine

Highest point
- Elevation: 313 m (1,027 ft)
- Listing: List of mountains in Burma
- Coordinates: 16°54′19″N 97°45′01″E

Naming
- Native name: တောင်ဝိုင်း (Burmese)

Geography
- Location within Myanmar
- Location: Hpa-an, Kayin State, Myanmar

Climbing
- First ascent: unknown
- Easiest route: climb

Mount Taung Wine (literally translates to 'round mountain', တောင်ဝိုင်း) Eastern Pwo Karen:လါင့်တၟိုဝ်ဝါန်ႋ is a mountain in Myanmar. It is located to the east of Hpa-An, Kayin State. The top of Taung Wine is 313 metres (1027 ft) above sea level. At the summit of Taung Wine Hill, Lawkawidu Pagoda (လောကဝိဓူစေတီ) marks the top. Taung Wine is a tourist destination and famous for its views and natural environment. After passing through 3 scenic spots while climbing, there is a steel stairway with a mild resemblance to the Haiku Stairs in Hawaii, that goes up to the top of the mountain.

== Gallery ==
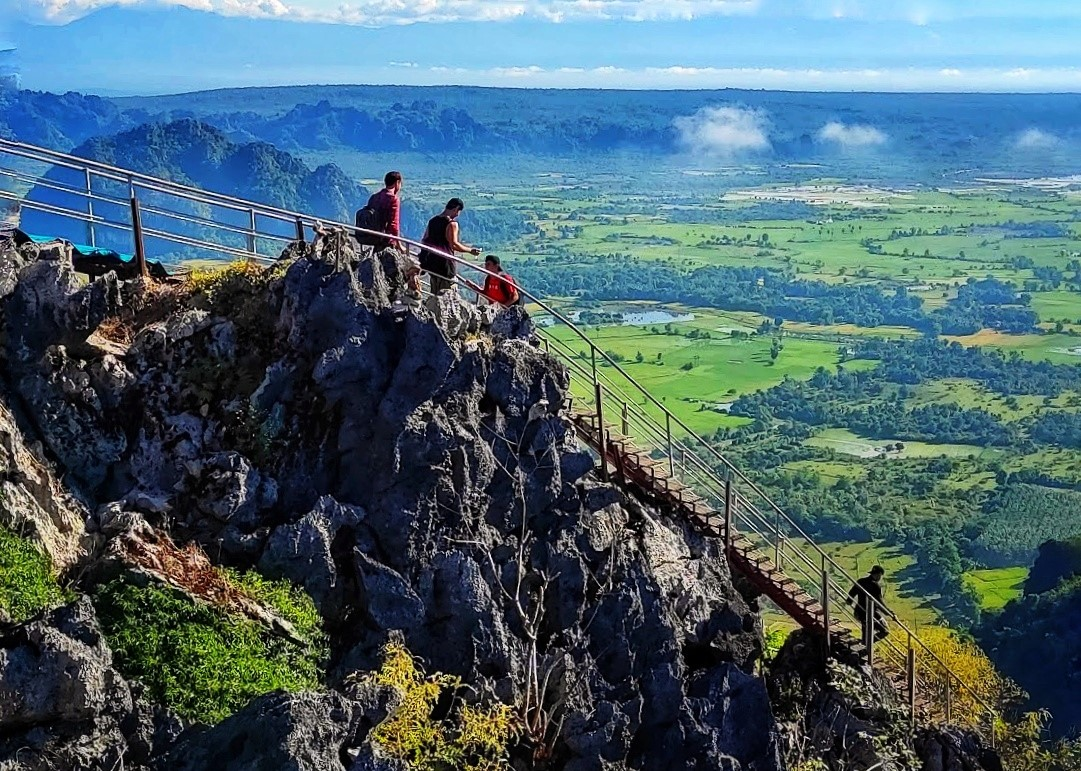
Taung Wine's Stairway to Heaven

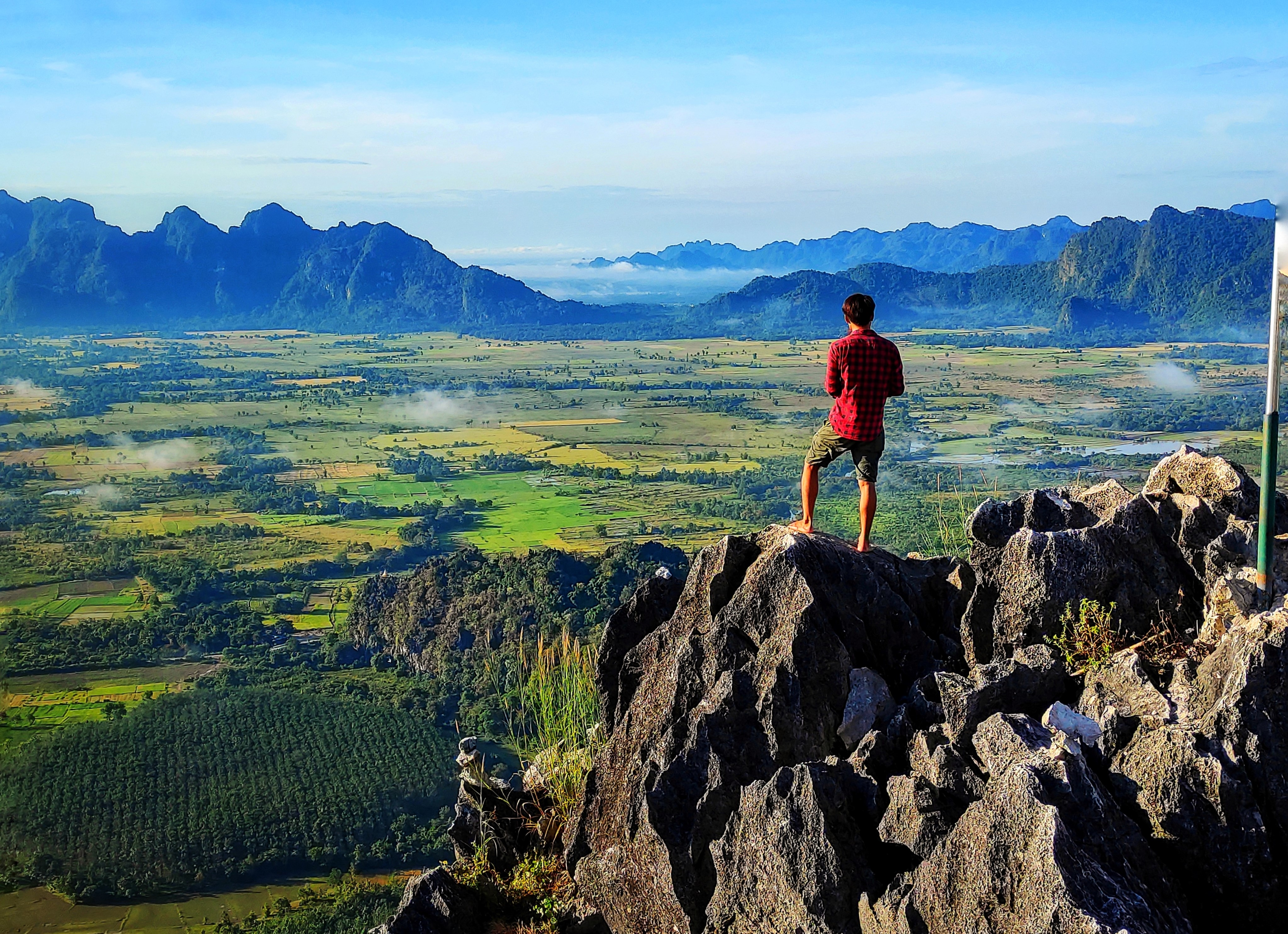
At the top of Taung Wine

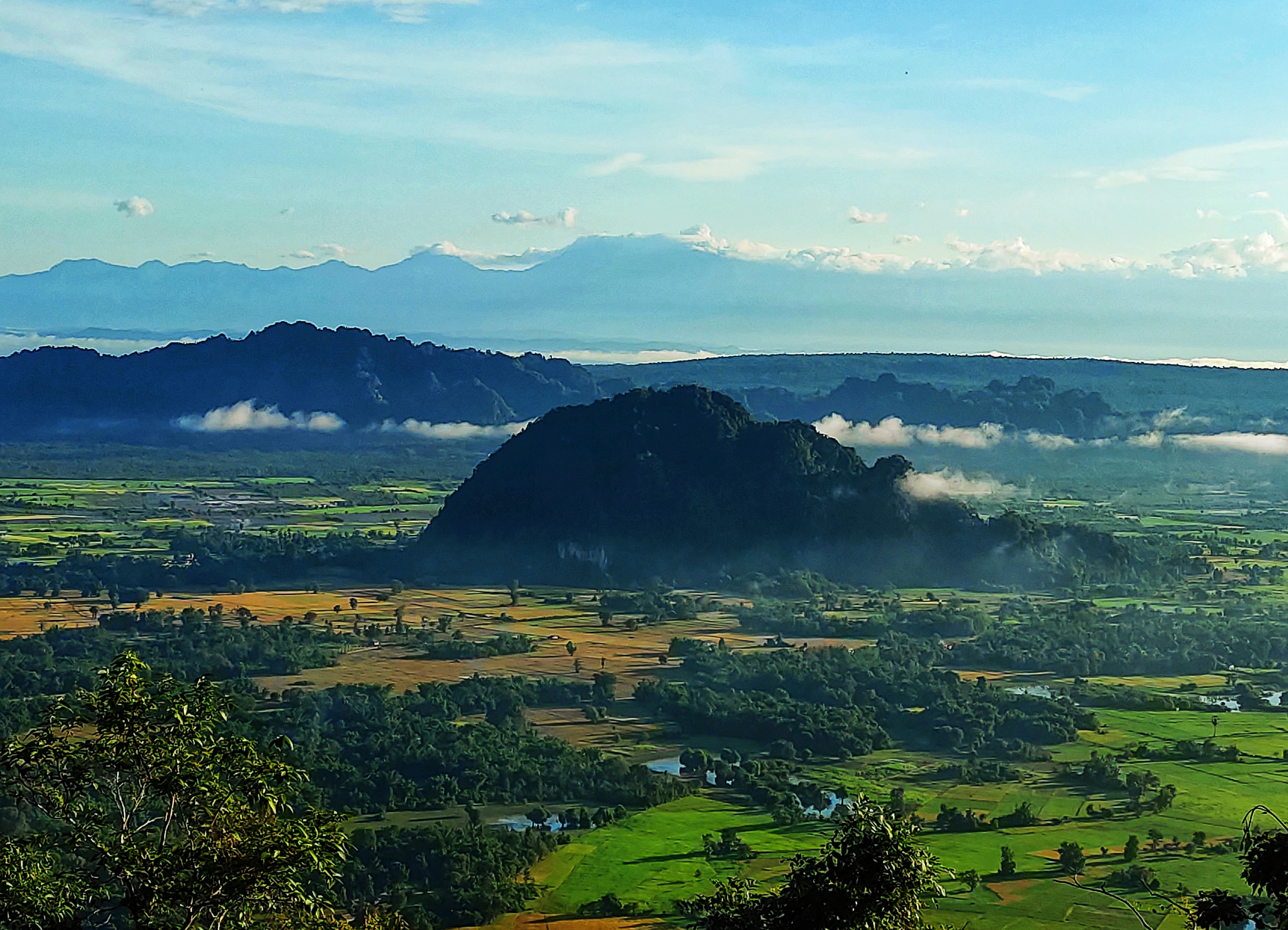
View from Mount Taung Wine

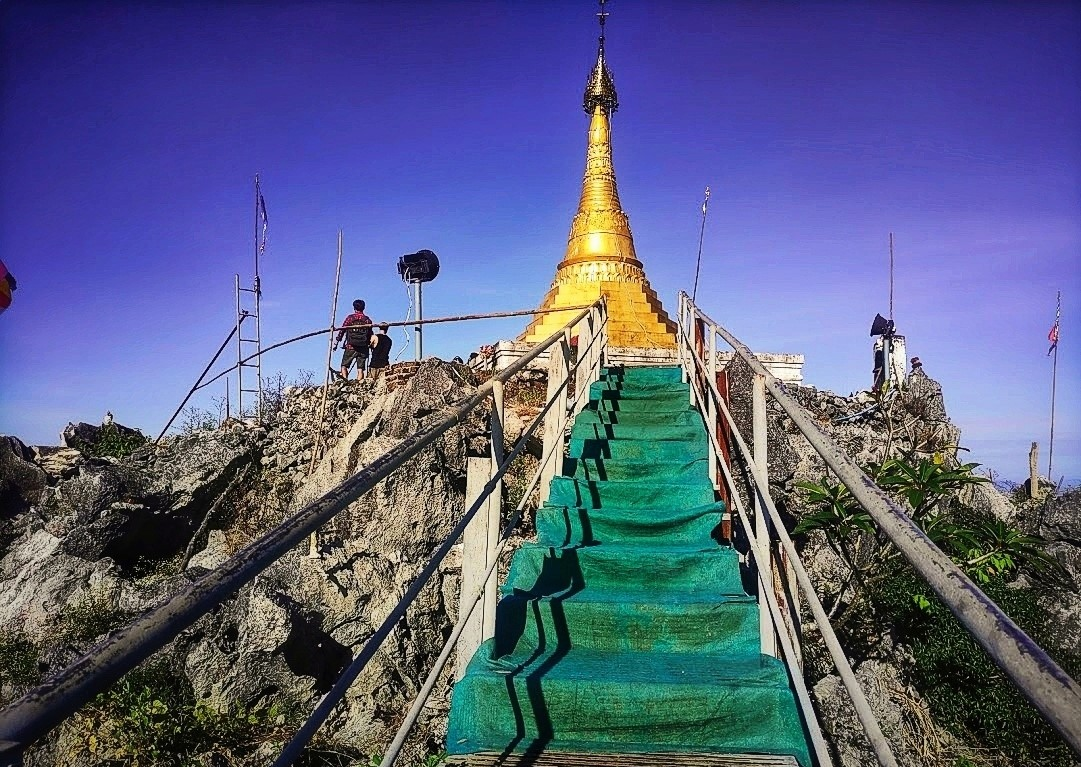
Lawkawidu Pagoda

== See also ==
- Taung Wine Hill bent-toed gecko
