= Mount Hpan Pu =

Mountain in Myanmar

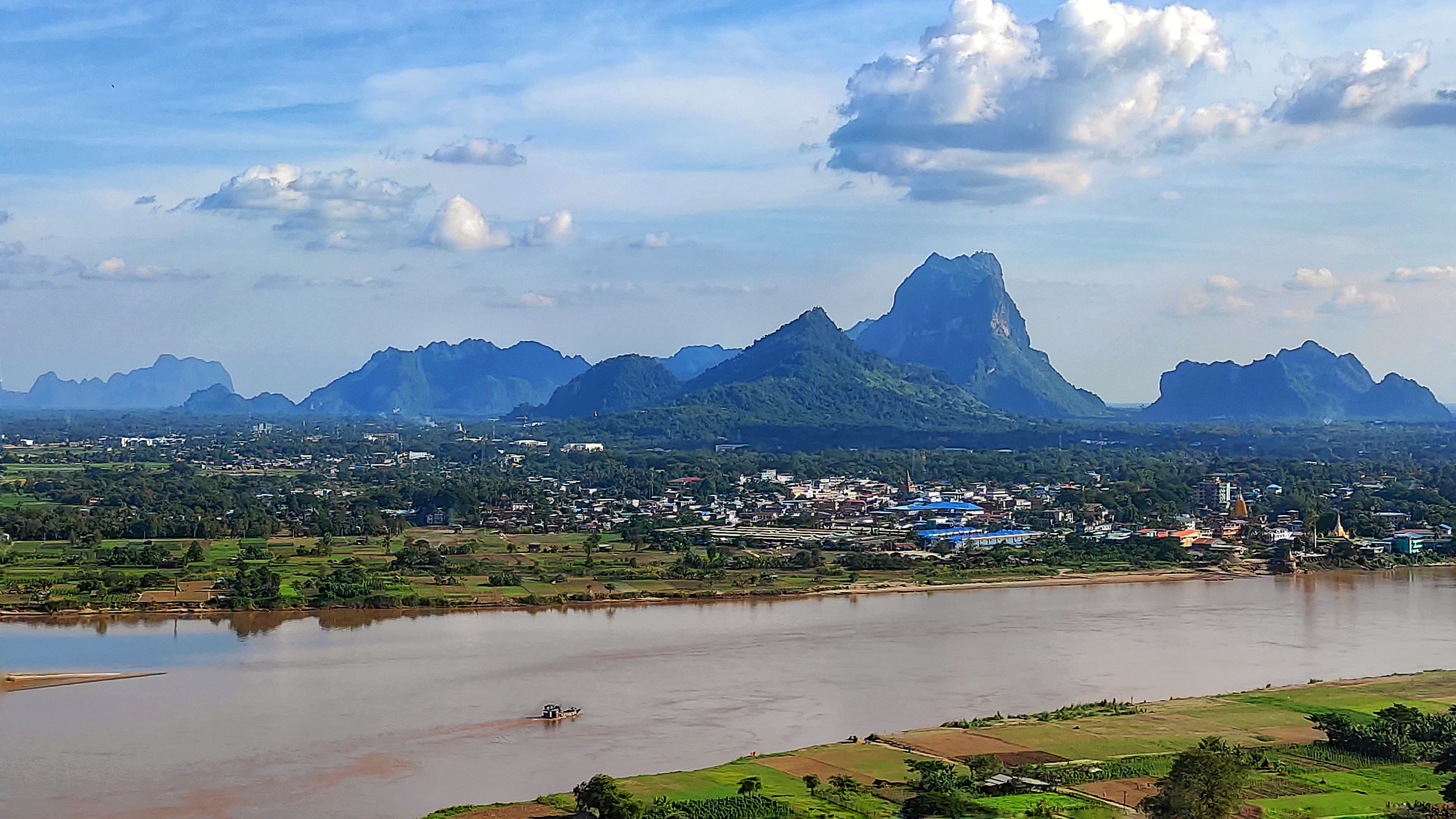
- Mount Hpan Pu

Highest point
- Elevation: 99 m (325 ft)
- Listing: List of mountains in Burma
- Coordinates: 16°54′31.61″N 97°37′33.39″E

Naming
- Native name: ဖားပုတောင် (Burmese)

Geography
- Location within Myanmar
- Location: Hpa-an, Kayin State, Myanmar

Climbing
- First ascent: unknown
- Easiest route: climb

Mount Hpan Pu (also spelled as Hpar Pu or Hpa Pu, ဖားပုတောင်) is a hill 99 metres (325 ft) high, north of Hpa-An, Kayin State in Myanmar. There is a golden pagoda at the top. Mount Hpan Pu is a tourist destination known for its landscape views. The trail to the top is 2.5 km long.

== Legend ==
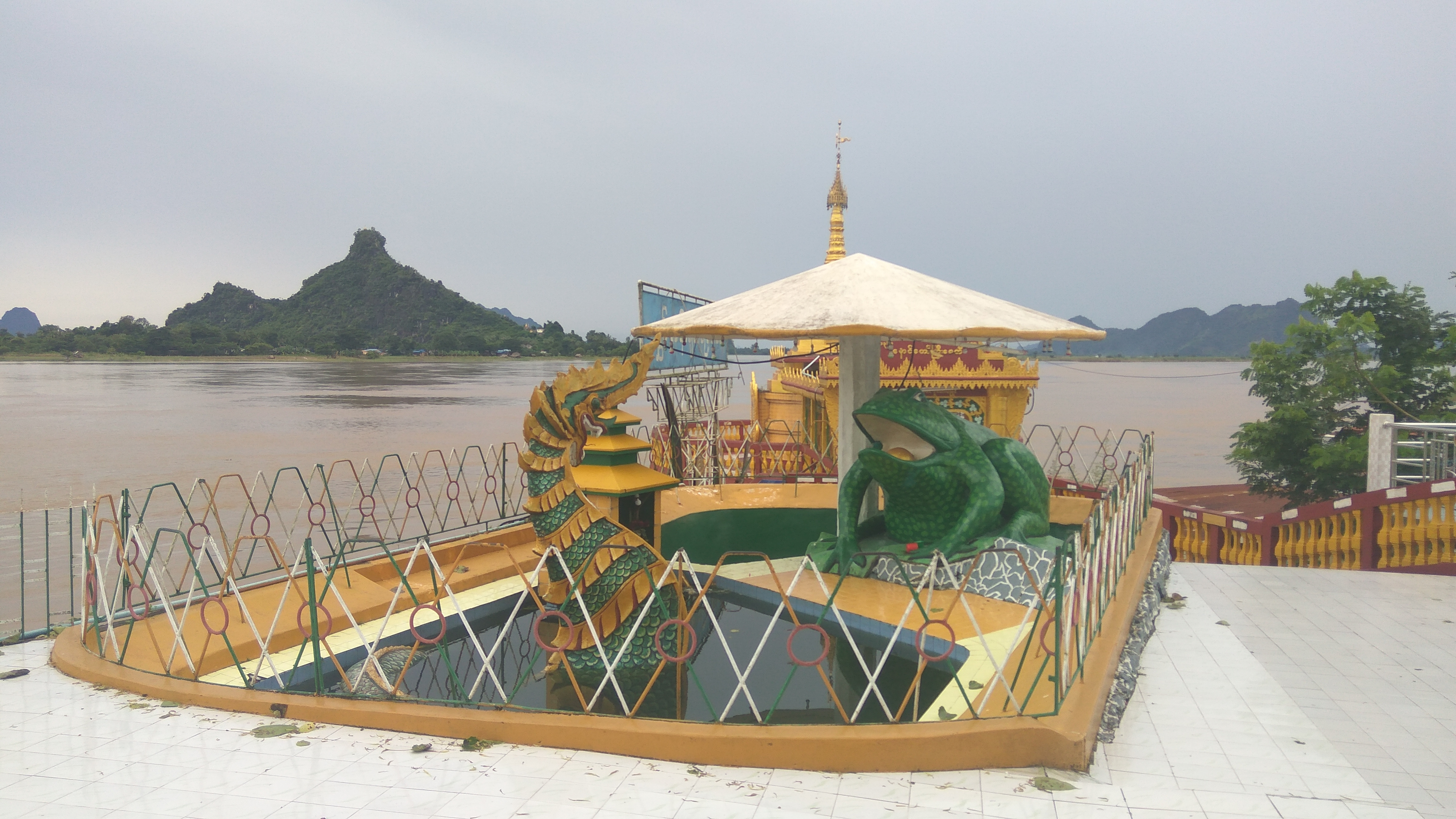
Statues of the dragon and frog

According to legend, King Mandu (မဏ္ဍုဖားမင်းကြီး), a giant frog, lived on the top of Mount Hpan Pu. One day, while out searching for food, he saw a large magic ruby with an emerald club placed on the throne in the foot cave of the hill, and the frog king thought the ruby was his food and swallowed it. He gained powers by swallowing the magic ruby and was able to resist his enemy, the dragon king. The place where the dragon king vomited the frog king is called Hpa-An (lit. 'vomit frog'). The impressive statues of these figures can be seen in the Shwe Yin Myaw Pagoda's compound.
