= Hpa-An Airport =

Hpa-An Airport ဖးအါကဘီယူၤပျီ ထ်ုအင်က္ၜင်ယူသၞေါဝ့်
- IATA: PAA; ICAO: VYPA

Summary
- Airport type: Public
- Operator: Ministry of Transport
- Serves: Hpa-An
- Location: Hpa-An, Myanmar
- Elevation AMSL: 41 ft / 12 m
- Coordinates: 16°53′38″N 097°40′30″E

Map
- Location of airport in Myanmar

Runways
| Direction | Length | | Surface |
| Direction | ft | m | Surface |
|---|---|---|---|
| 03/21 | 4,502 | 1,372 | Asphalt |

Hpa-An Airport (IATA: PAA, ICAO: VYPA) is an airport of serving Hpa-an (also spelled Pa-An), a city of Karen in south-eastern Myanmar.

== Facilities ==
The airport resides at an elevation of 41 feet (12 m) above mean sea level. It has one runway designated 03/21 with an asphalt surface measuring 4,502 by 102 feet (1,372 m × 31 m).

== Former airlines and destinations ==
| Myanmar National Airlines||Yangon ||Terminated|| Now, it's not used for public routes.
