= Kawgun Cave =

Natural limestone cave in Hpa-An, Karen State, Myanmar

Coordinates: 16°49′23″N 97°35′09″E

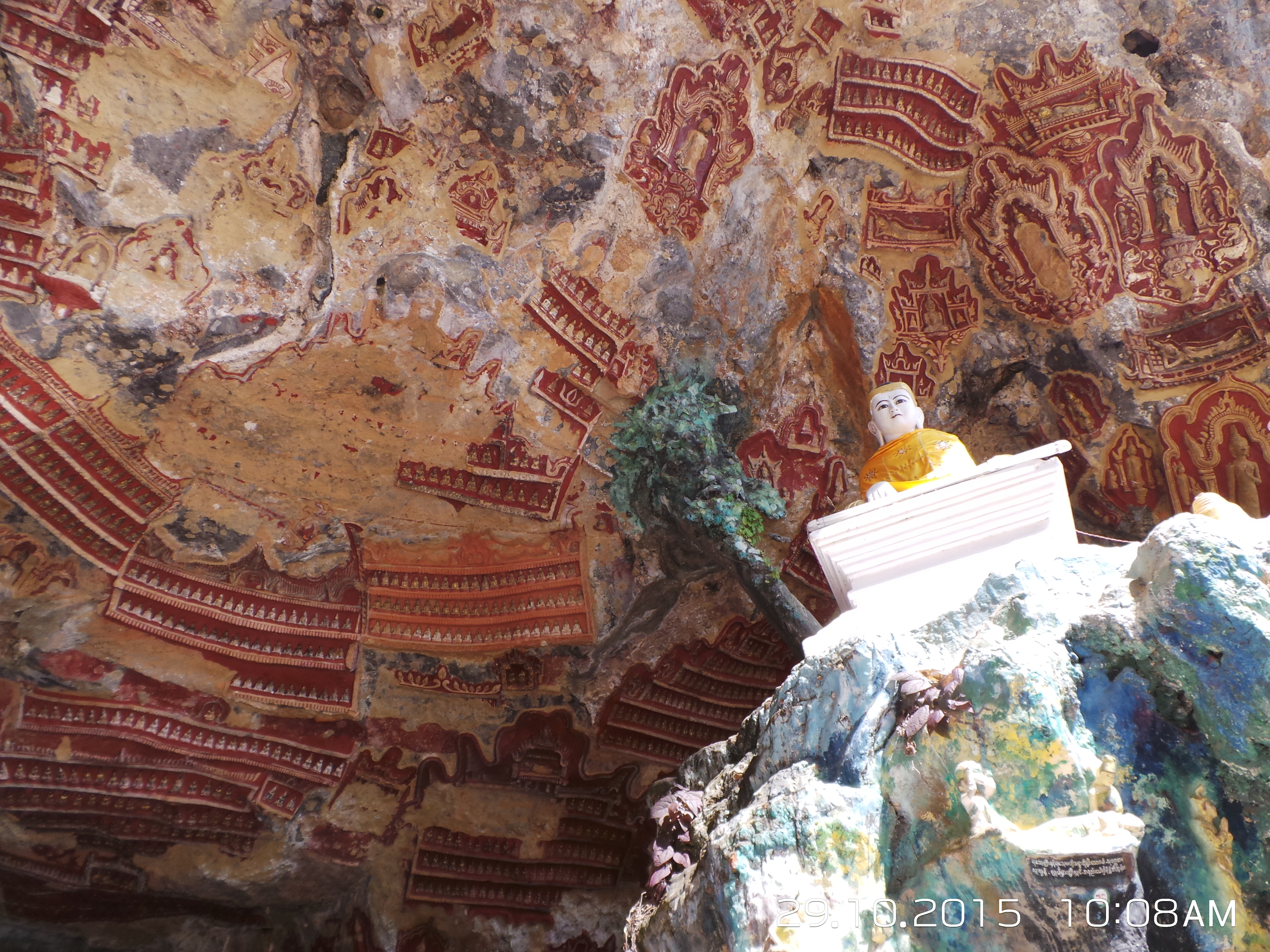
Kawgun Cave

The Kawgun Cave (Burmese: ကော့ဂွန်းဂူ; Mon : ထီုကအ်ဂေါန်; also spelled Kawgon Cave or Kawgoon Cave) is a Buddhist cave temple, located in Kawgun Village, Hpa-An, Kayin State, Myanmar. The cave is lined with thousands of small Buddha statues covering its walls. The cave is an important historical and cultural heritage site in Myanmar.

== Location ==
The Kawgun Cave is located eight miles from Hpa-an, 28 miles from Mawlamyine, and two miles from the west bank of Thanlwin River. Located at the foot of Mt. Kawgun, the cave is 130 feet long, 70 feet wide, and 25 feet high. Mt. Kawgun is 60,000 feet long from northeast to southwest, and the highest point is 10,000 feet high.

== History ==
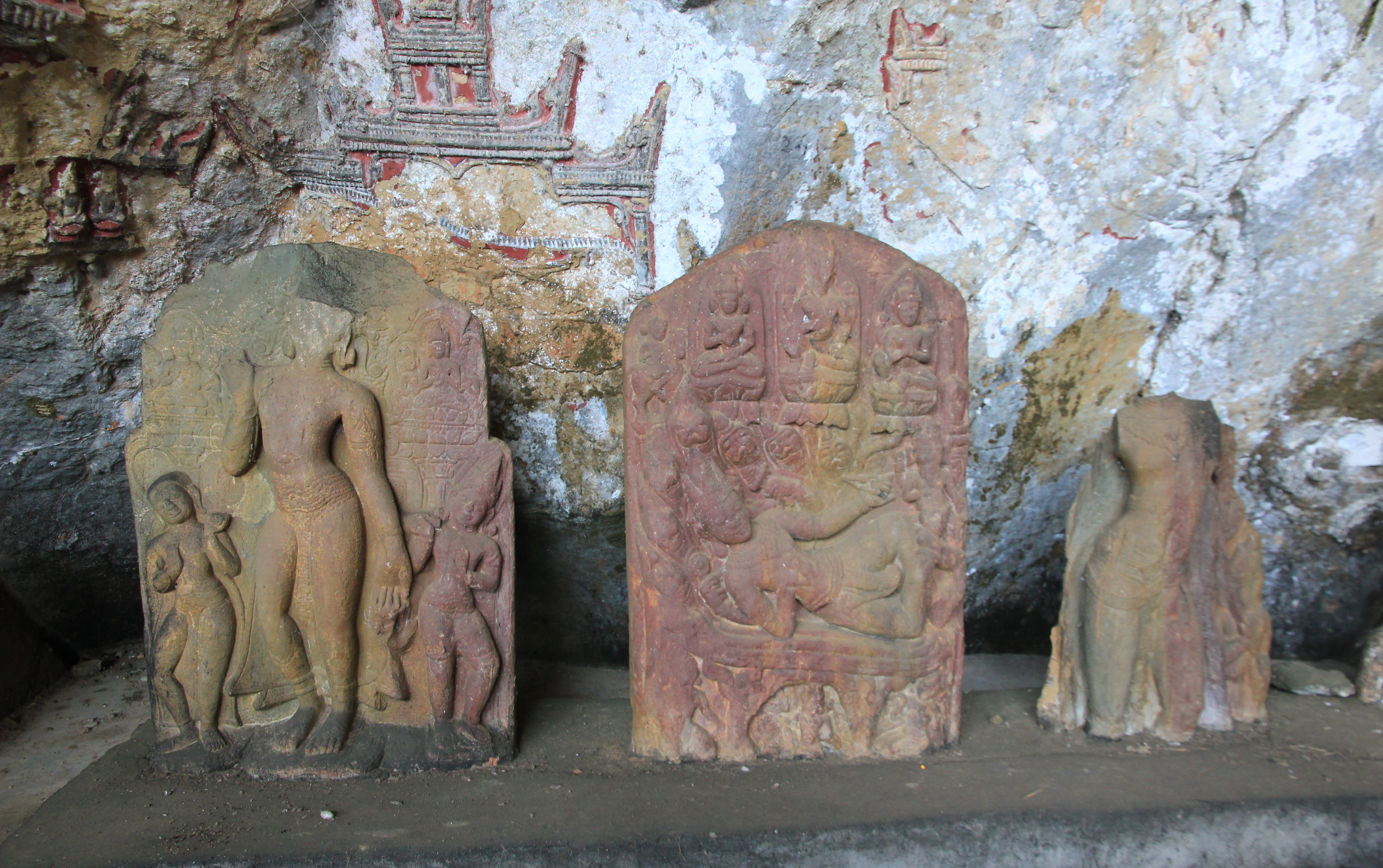
Statues of Hindu gods (middle), statues of Bodisattvas (left and right)

The Kawgun Cave is a limestone cave. The origins of the cave temple are not clear. It is believed to have been constructed around the 7th century, but historian Nai Maung Toe has speculated, on the basis of its inscriptions, that the site might date as far back as the 6th or 7th century. The first known Western visitor to the cave was John Crawfurd in January 1827.

Three stone reliefs were found in the Kawgun Cave, two of which are related to Buddhism, and the third to Hinduism. One of the Buddhist reliefs has 23 lines of the ancient Mon script carved on the left side of the statue's robe. The right side of the robe is broken, and only 3 lines remain. In addition to the depictions of Brahma, Vishnu and Shiva in the Hindu stone reliefs, there is also an image of Ganesh. The Kawgun Cave has stone and ink inscriptions that can supplement the historical evidence. The ink inscription states the names of the donors and their wishes, as well as the number of Buddha images they donated. According to the stone inscription written in the ancient Mon script, some Buddha statues were donated by a queen consort of Martaban. When King Anawrahta of Pagan conquered Thaton Kingdom and took King Manuha to Pagan, the queen consort of Martaban escaped. It is said that she hid in the Kawgun Cave and donated Buddha statues there.

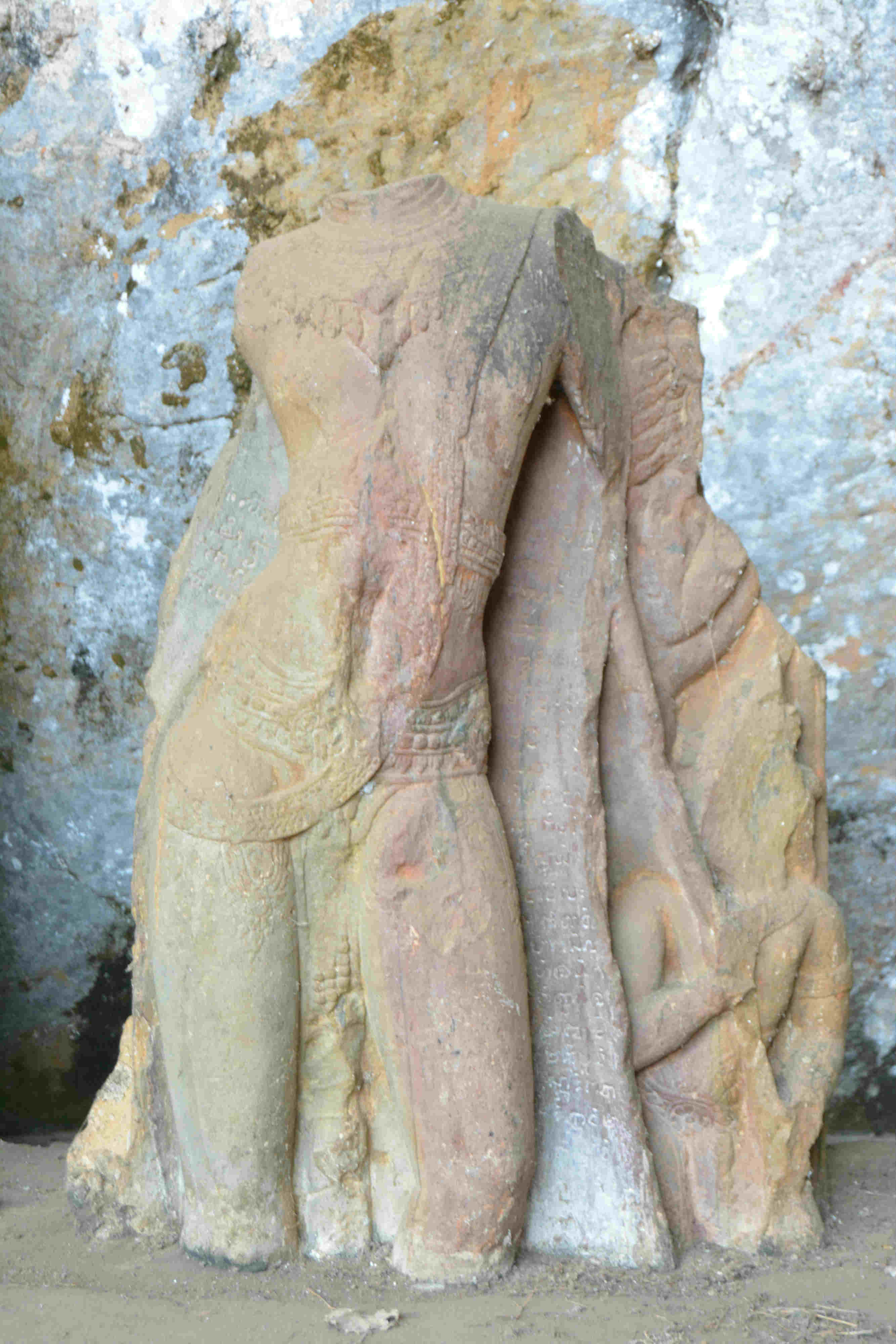
The stone sculpture where the Mon inscription was inscribed on the hem of the robe.

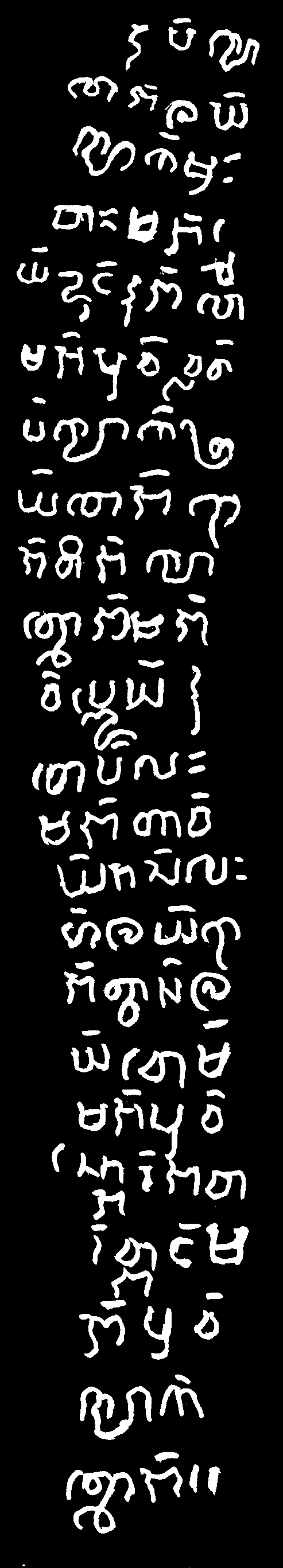
Mon script of the inscription

The inscription has 23 lines in ancient Mon language. It can be generally divided into two categories, donation and wish. The nearest translation is as follows:

(In Burmese): "ဤဘုရားဆင်းတုတော်ကို မူးတး (မုတ္တမ) မိဖုရားဖြစ်သူ ကျွန်ုပ်သည် ဒုအေ်ဝါပ်မြို့၌ နေထိုင်ပြီး ဤဆင်းတုတော်ကိုထုထွင်းပြုလုပ်ခဲ့သည်။ ဒုအေ်ဝါပ် မြို့အတွင်း၌သော်လည်းကောင်း၊ မြို့နယ်ပြင်ပ၌သော်လည်းကောင်းတည်ရှိသမျှသော မြေနှင့်ကျောက်ဆင်းတုတော်တို့ကို ကျွန်ုပ်နှင့်ကျွန်ုပ်၏တပည့်များက စွမ်းရည်ရှိ၍ ထွင်းထုခဲ့သည်။ အခြားအခြားသော ဆရာများသည် ကျောက်ဘုရားများကို ထုထွင်းနိုင်ပါစေသတည်း"

(Translation): "I'm the queen of Muhtah (Muttama) living in Du'vop, carved this Buddha. My disciples and I assertiverly made the terra-cotta Buddha images and carved stone Buddha statues in Du'vop and in the province. I inspired other masters to carve stone Buddha."

— Queen of Martaban

The cultural heritage in Kawgun Cave is being maintained by the Ministry of Culture with technology and protected by laws.
