= Linno Cave =

Cave in Myanmar

Coordinates: 16°50′56.9″N 97°36′38.8″E

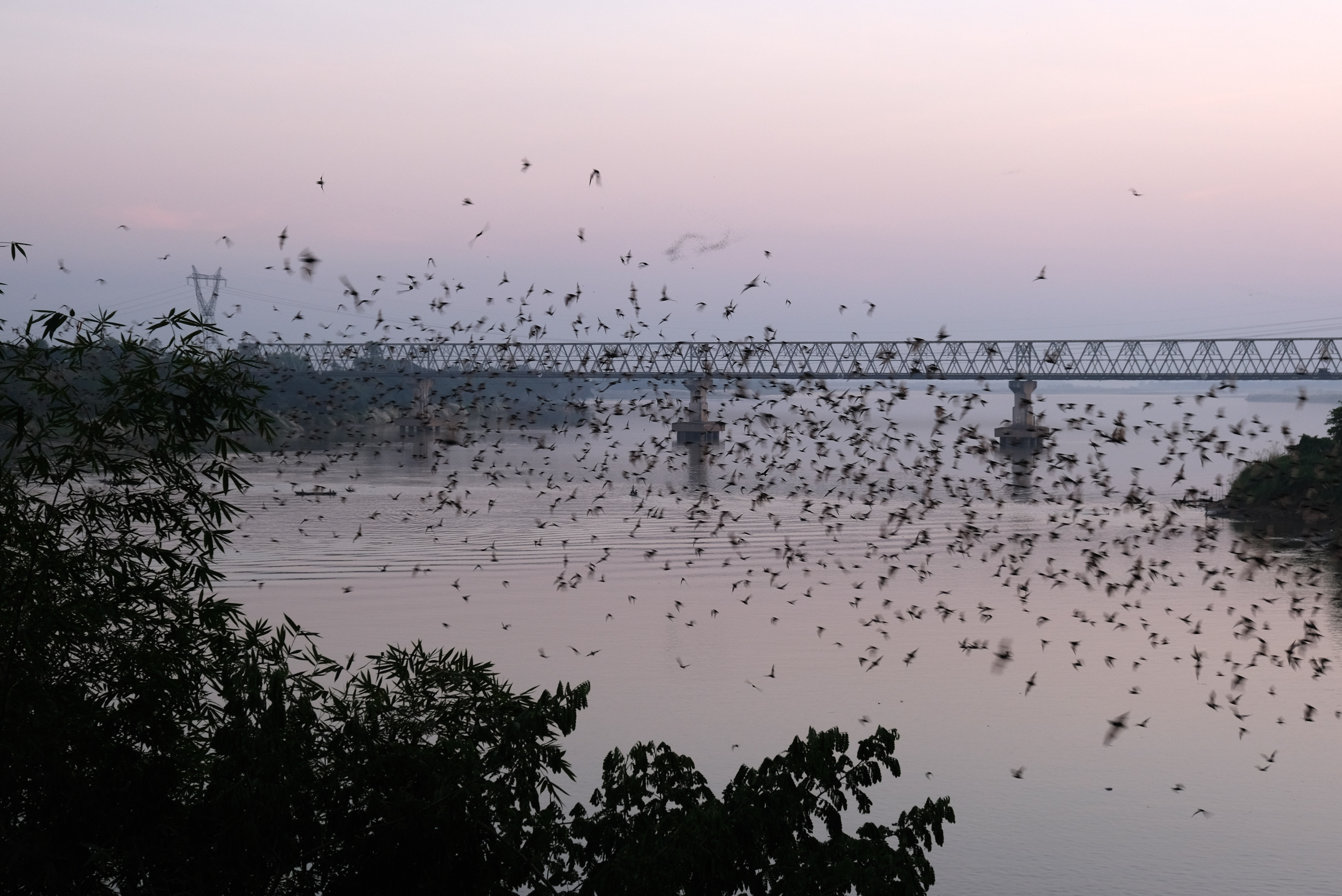
View outside Linno Cave at sunset

Linno Cave (lit. 'Bat Cave', Burmese: လင်းနို့ဂူ) is a natural limestone cave and home to more than 500,000 bats of over 10 species, including wrinkle-lipped free-tailed bats, lesser horseshoe bats and cave nectar bats. It is located in Hpa-an, Kayin State, Myanmar. Linno Cave is a tourist destination and a famous place to see the sunset with thousands of bats flying out of the cave.
