= Kayin State Cultural Museum =

Karen State Cultural Museum
- ကရင်ပြည်နယ်ယဉ်ကျေးမှုပြတိုက် ကညီတၢ်ဆဲးတၢ်လၤမၠူစံအၢ
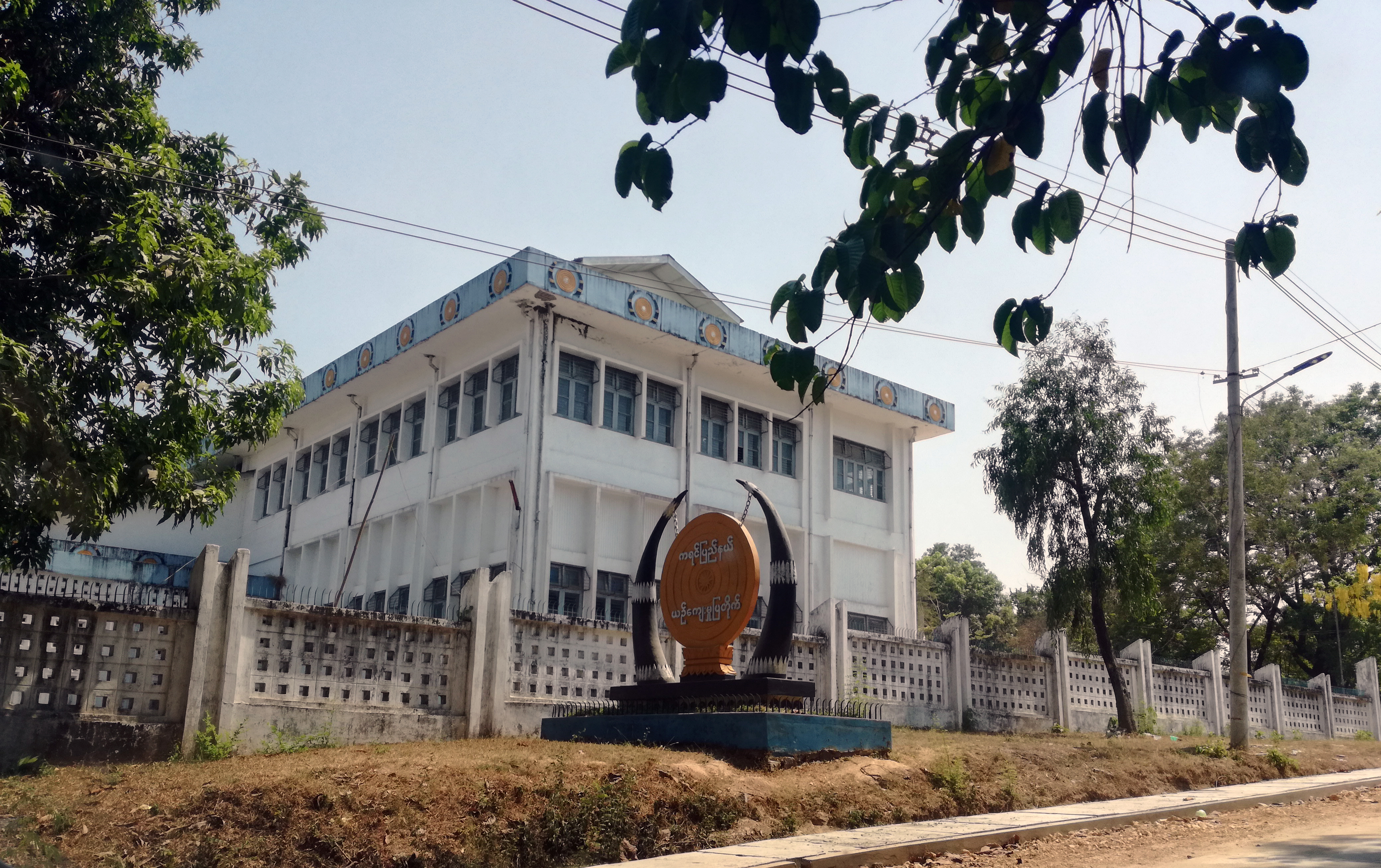
- Established: November 1992
- Location: Hpa-an, Karen State
- Coordinates: 16.8799°N 97.6306°E
- Type: Cultural museum

The Kayin State Cultural Museum (Burmese: ကရင်ပြည်နယ်ယဉ်ကျေးမှုပြတိုက်, S'gaw Karen: ကညီတၢ်ဆဲးတၢ်လၤမၠူစံအၢ) Eastern Pwo Karen:ဖၠုံခါန်ႋကၞင့်ဆ်ုၰီ့လါၮဲဖၠဟ်တုဂ် is a museum in Hpa-an, Kayin State in Burma that displays figurines of Kayin national races, ivory, musical instruments, Buddha images, household utensils, looms, lacquerware and literature of the Kayin races.

The museum is located on Zwegabin St in Hpa-an. It is a two-storey white building next to the city hall.

The museum was established in November 1992.

Admission fees is US$2.
