= Kyauk Ka Lat Pagoda =

Buddhist Pagoda in Kayin, Myanmar

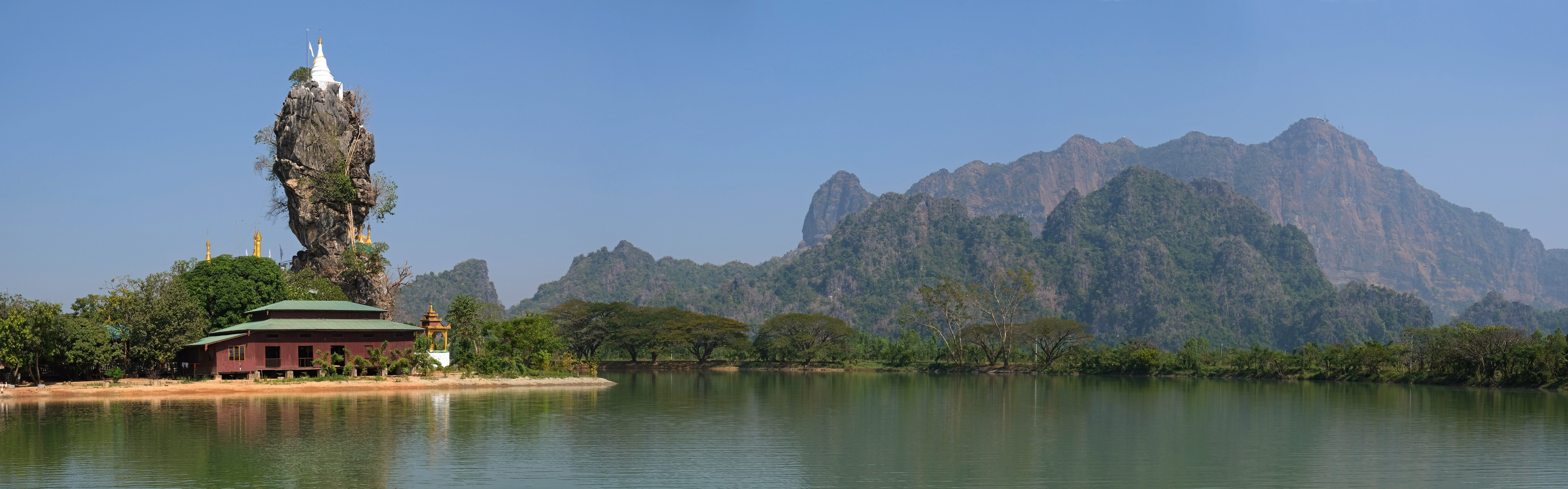
- The Kyauk Ka Lat Pagoda and its surroundings

- Location within Myanmar

Religion
- Affiliation: Buddhism
- Sect: Theravada Buddhism
- Region: Kayin State
- Status: active

Location
- Country: Myanmar

The Kyauk Ka Lat Pagoda (Burmese: ကျောက်ကလက်) is a Buddhist temple in the Kayin State, Myanmar. The temple complex is built onto a prominent limestone rock formation surrounded by an artificial lake, and houses an active community of monks.

== Description ==
The complex at Kyauk Kalat contains a number of structures, shrines, and temples set on a limestone rock formation. The temple is located several miles away from the city of Hpa-An, and is in close proximity to a number of other Buddhist sites. The temple complex is a functional monastery, and is open for tours.

During the 19th century, the temple's Pongyi (a Buddhist priest) was involved in a revolt against the British Empire in the aftermath of the Third Anglo-Burmese War. Thamanya Sayadaw—later known as a proponent of metta—taught at the monastery in the 1920s.
