= Hpa-an =

Capital city of Kayin State, Myanmar

Hpa-an Burmese: ဘားအံမြို့ S'gaw Karen: ဖၣ်အၣ်ဝ့ၢ် Pwo Eastern Karen: ဍုံထ်ုအင် Mon: ဘာအၚ်
- Capital Town
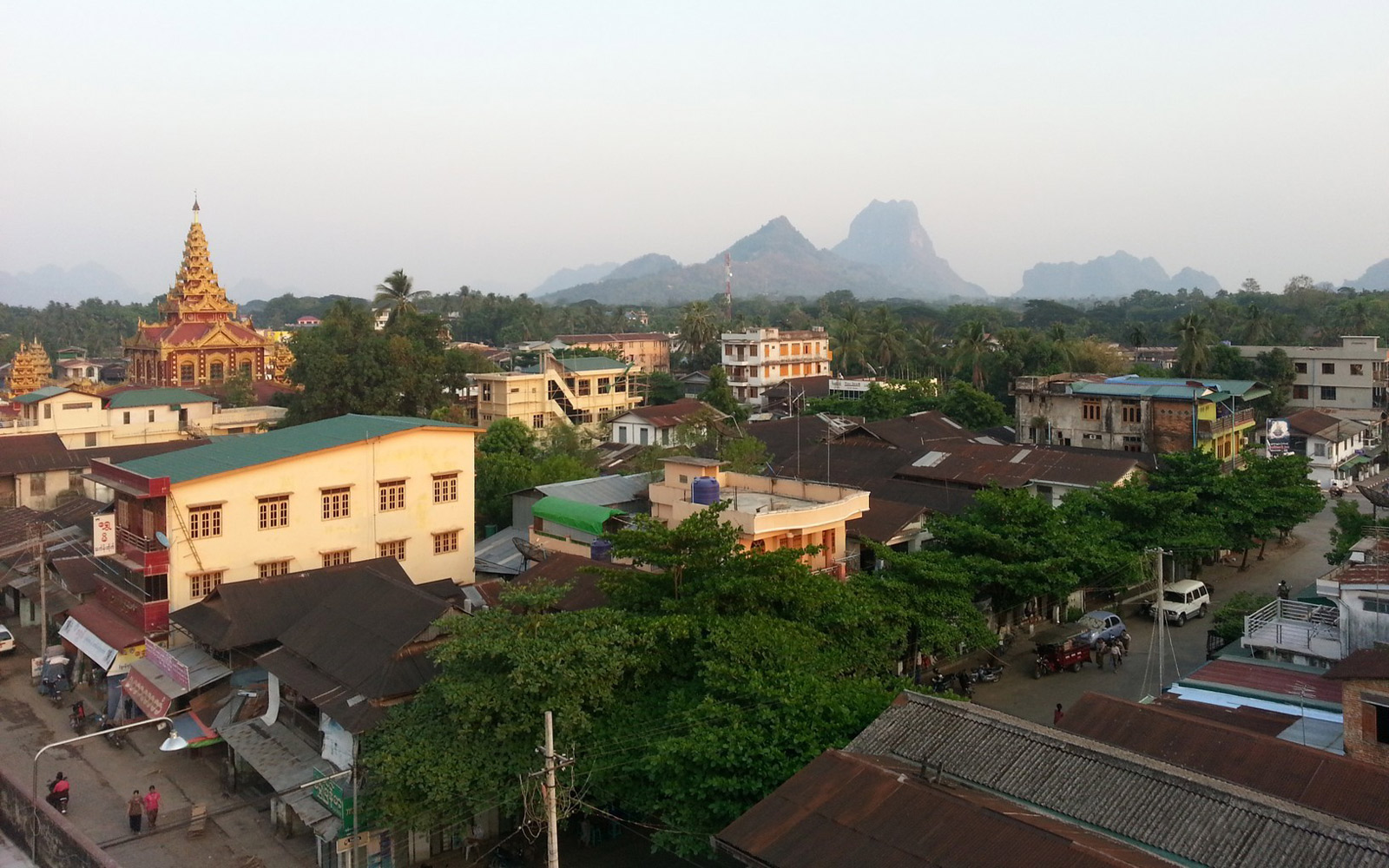
- Downtown Hpa-an

- Location in Myanmar (Burma)
- Coordinates: 16°53′26″N 97°38′0″E
- Country: Myanmar
- Division: Kayin State
- District: Hpa-an District
- Township: Hpa-an Township

Government
  - Mayor: Saw Khaung Pan Htawt (PSDP)

Population (2014 census)
  - Total: 75,141
  - Ethnicities: Sgaw Karen; Pwo Karen; Mon; Bamar; Pa’O; Karenni; Kayan
  - Religions: Buddhism; Christianity
- Time zone: UTC+6.30 (MMT)
- Area code: 58
- Website: Myanmar

Hpa-an (Burmese: ဘားအံမြို့, [pʰə ʔàɰ̃ mjo̰]; Pwo Eastern Karen: ဍုံထ်ုအင်; S'gaw Karen: ဖၣ်အၣ်ဝ့ၢ်; Mon: ဘာအၚ်, also spelled Pa-an) is a large city in southeastern Myanmar and the capital and largest city of Kayin State (Karen State). The population as of the 2014 Myanmar census was 75,141, mostly of the Karen ethnic groups. The native regional Karen ethnic group are the Pwo, whose language is widely spoken. However the S’gaw Karen are more dominant and their language is used as a lingua franca. Hpa-An has surpassed Taunggyi as the fifth largest city in Myanmar.

== Legend ==
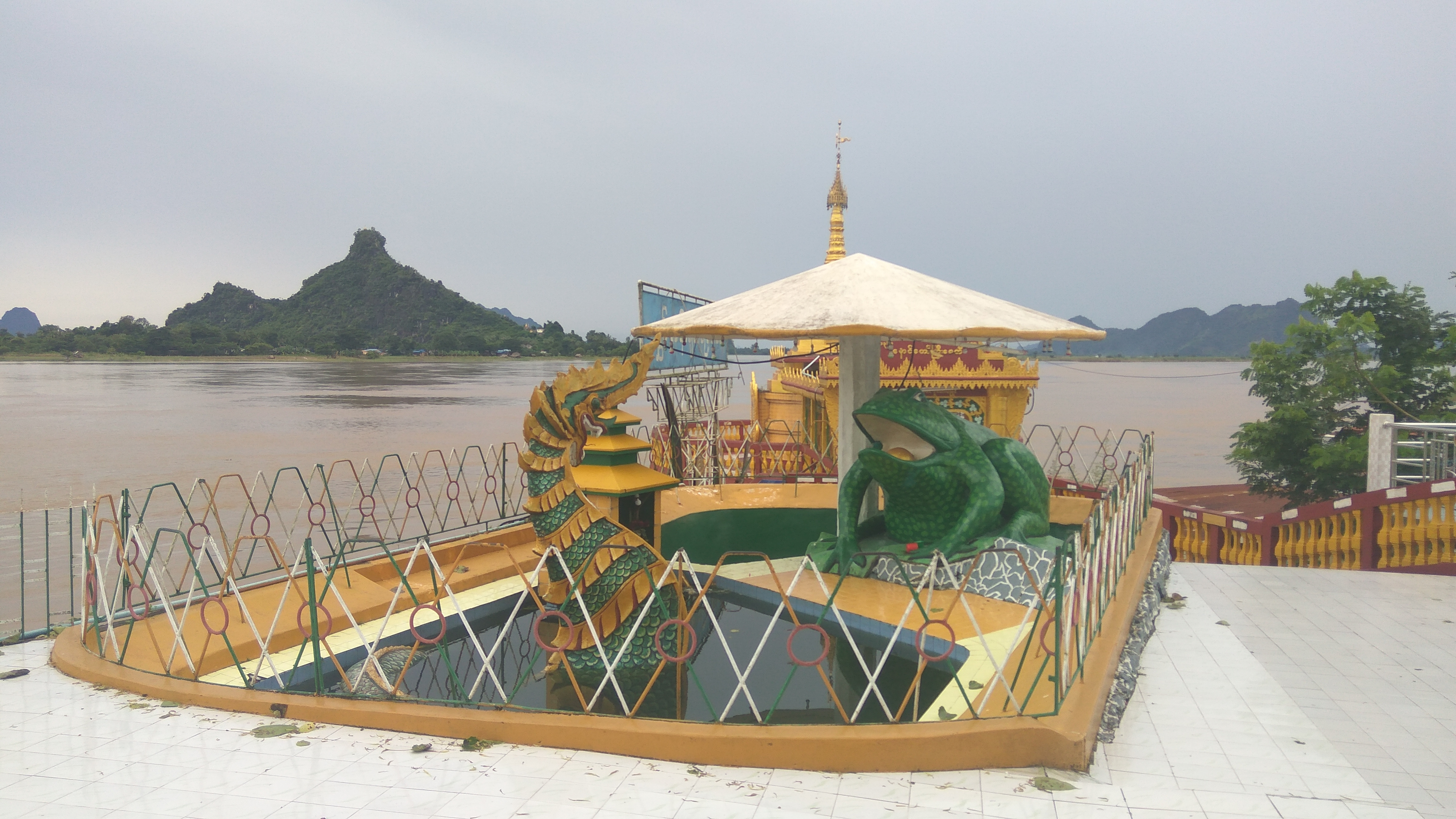
Statues of the dragon and frog

Legend has it that Hpa-An was created by the dragon king and the frog king. King Mandu (မဏ္ဍုဖားမင်းကြီး), a giant frog, lived at the top of the Mount Hpan Pu. One day, while out searching for food, he saw a large magic ruby with an emerald club placed on the throne in the foot cave of Mount Hpan Pu. The frog king thought the ruby was his food, and as he swallowed it, he gained the powers of the magic ruby and was able to resist his enemy, the dragon king. The place where the dragon king vomited the frog king is therefore called Hpa-An (ဖားအန်, lit. 'vomit frog'). The statues of these figures can be seen in the Shwe Yin Myaw Pagoda's compound.

== Climate ==
Hpa-An has an extreme tropical monsoon climate (Köppen Am). Temperatures are hot throughout the year, although maximum temperatures are somewhat depressed in the monsoon season due to heavy cloud and rain. There is a winter dry season (November–April) and a summer wet season (May–October). Torrential rain falls from June to September, with over 1,100 millimetres (43 in) per month in July and August.

Climate data for Hpa-An (1991–2020)
Month	Jan	Feb	Mar	Apr	May	Jun	Jul	Aug	Sep	Oct	Nov	Dec	Year
Mean daily maximum °C (°F)	34.0 (93.2)	35.9 (96.6)	37.3 (99.1)	37.9 (100.2)	33.9 (93.0)	30.2 (86.4)	29.2 (84.6)	28.9 (84.0)	31.0 (87.8)	34.0 (93.2)	34.6 (94.3)	33.6 (92.5)	33.4 (92.1)
Daily mean °C (°F)	26.0 (78.8)	27.5 (81.5)	29.6 (85.3)	31.1 (88.0)	29.1 (84.4)	26.9 (80.4)	26.3 (79.3)	26.2 (79.2)	27.3 (81.1)	28.9 (84.0)	28.3 (82.9)	26.3 (79.3)	27.8 (82.0)
Mean daily minimum °C (°F)	18.0 (64.4)	19.0 (66.2)	21.9 (71.4)	24.4 (75.9)	24.3 (75.7)	23.7 (74.7)	23.4 (74.1)	23.4 (74.1)	23.7 (74.7)	23.8 (74.8)	22.0 (71.6)	19.0 (66.2)	22.2 (72.0)
Average rainfall mm (inches)	8.5 (0.33)	3.0 (0.12)	17.2 (0.68)	43.5 (1.71)	380.4 (14.98)	845.8 (33.30)	1,126.6 (44.35)	1,120.2 (44.10)	614.1 (24.18)	189.1 (7.44)	27.8 (1.09)	15.3 (0.60)	4,391.3 (172.89)
Average rainy days (≥ 1.0 mm)	0.5	0.3	1.4	3.9	18.1	26.8	28.5	28.8	23.8	12.1	2.2	0.9	147.3
Source: World Meteorological Organization

== Demographics ==
Historical population
Year	Pop.	±%
1953	4,100	—
1983	41,500	+912.2%
2014	75,141	+81.1%

The majority of residents are Theravada Buddhists, followed by Baptists, Anglicans, and Roman Catholics. As of the 2014 census, the city had a population of 75,141.

== Transport ==
=== Air ===
Hpa-An was linked to Yangon, Mawlamyine and Hpapun by air but the airport ceased operations.

=== Buses ===
There are express buses from Hpa-An to Yangon, Mawlamyine, the border crossing at Myawaddy and other towns.

== Education ==
- Computer University, Hpa-An
- Hpa-An Education College
- Hpa-An Nursing Training School
- Hpa-An University
- Technological University, Hpa-An
- No. 1 Basic Education High School, Hpa-an
- No. 2 Basic Education High School, Hpa-an
- No. 3 Basic Education High School, Hpa-an
- No. 4 Basic Education High School, Hpa-an
- No. 5 Basic Education High School, Hpa-an

== Sights ==
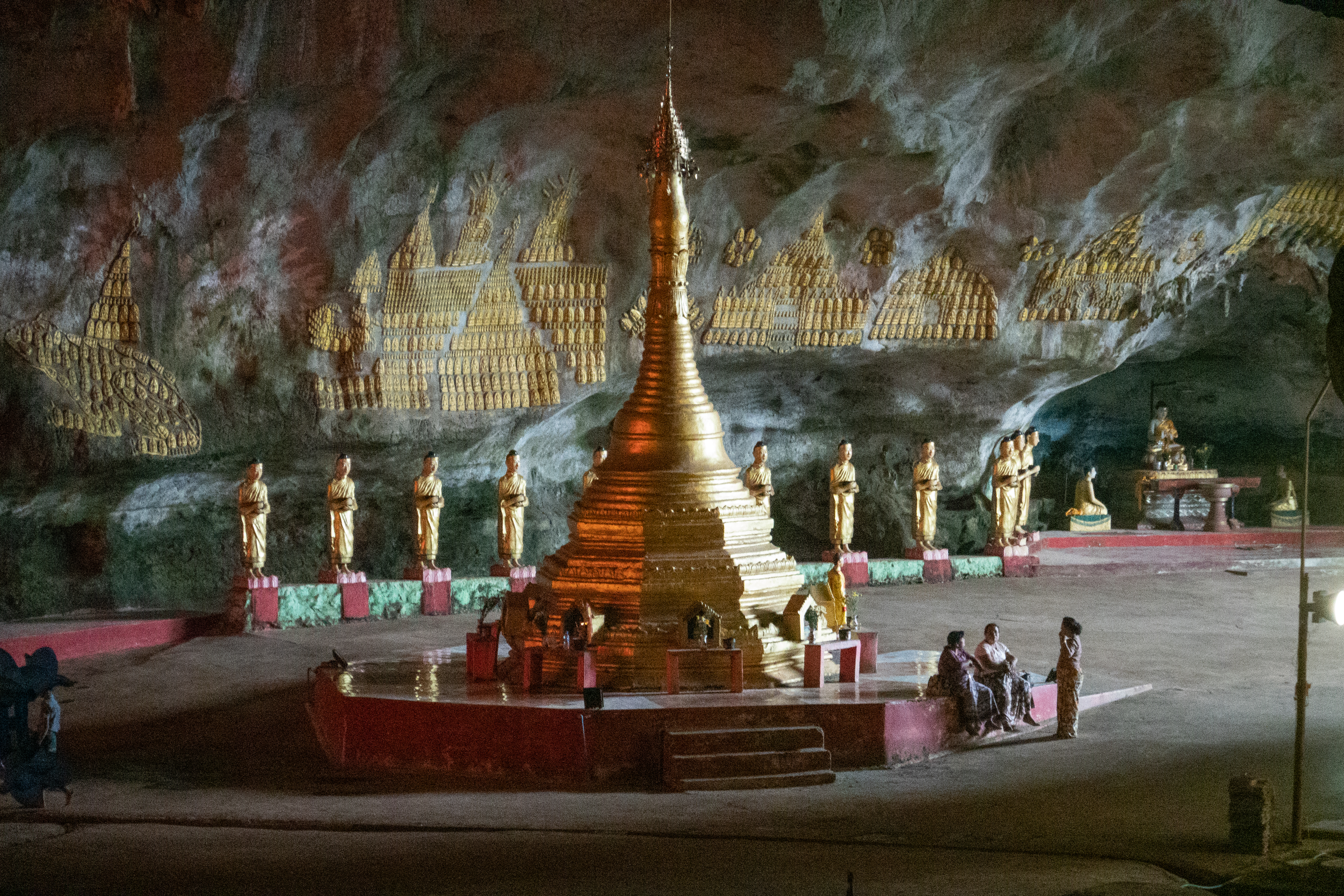
Saddan Cave

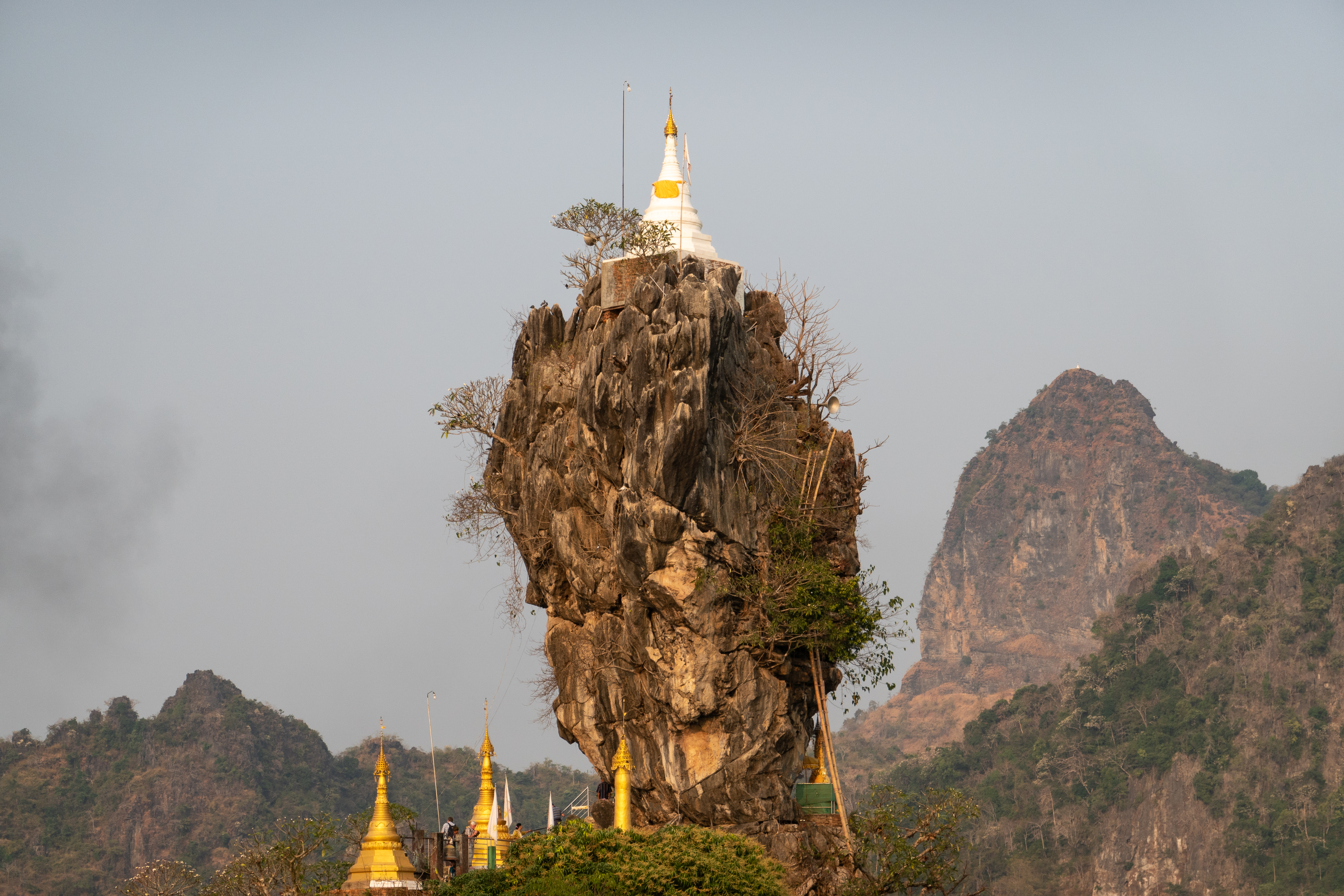
Kyauk Ka Lat

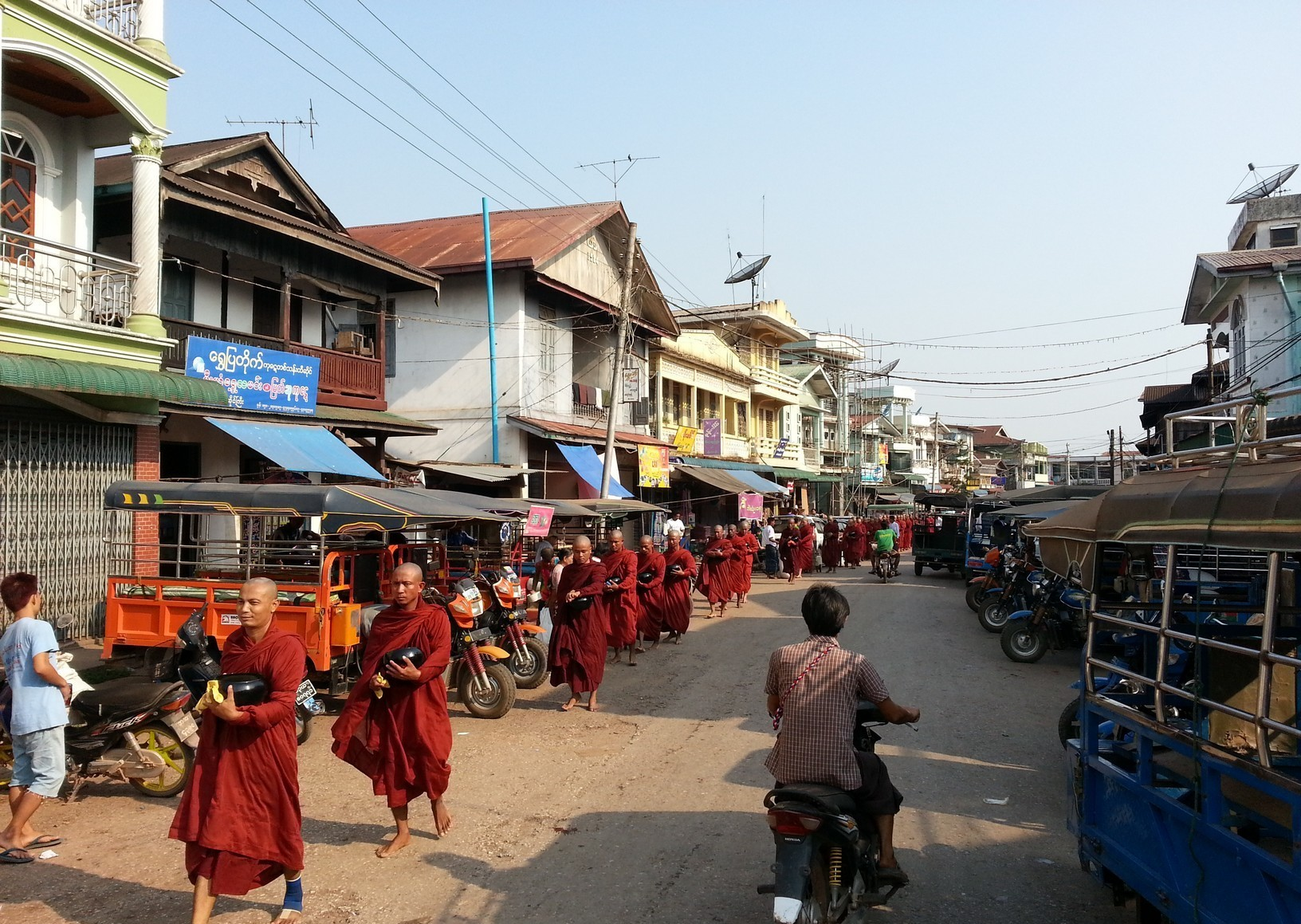
Local Buddhist monks

Kayin State Cultural Museum is located in Hpa-An. Mount Zwegabin and Mount Taung Wine are attractive places for visitors, as well as Kyauk Ka Lat Pagoda in which the sacred hair relic of Buddha is enshrined. Hpa An is famous for many limestone caves, like

- Bayin Nyi Naung Cave,
- Yathae Byan Cave,
- Kawgon Cave (or Kawgoon Cave),
- Kaw-ka-thaung Cave,
- Saddan Cave and
- Linno Cave

The caves include ancient Buddha images and other cultural items, which were once less known due to regional instability. The Shwe Yin Myaw Pagoda and Thit Hta Man Aung Pagoda are in the center of Hpa-an. Other places are Kyone Htaw Waterfall, which is 2 hours driving from Hpa-an, and the Saddan Cave (mentioned above) which is the biggest and longest cave in Kayin State. The beautiful Kan Thar Yar Lake and its bridge are the heart of Kayin State.

== Health care ==
- Hpa-An General Hospital
- Taung Kalay Military Hospital

== Sports ==
=== Football ===
Zwegabin United FC, founded in 2010, is based in Hpa-An. The club is competing in Myanmar National League.

=== Trekking and hiking ===
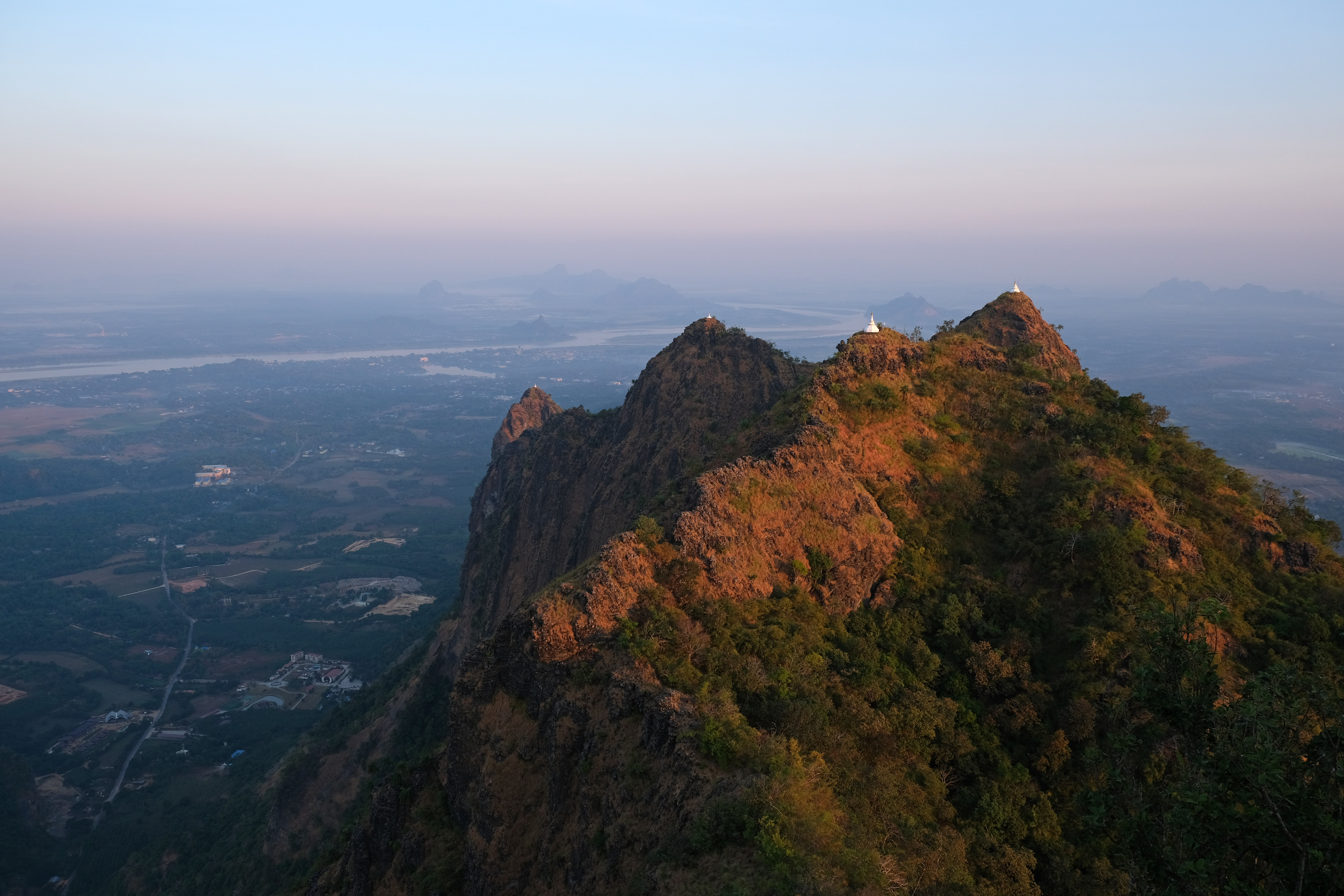
View from Mount Zwegabin towards Hpa An.

Mount Zwegabin is around 8.5 km south of Hpa An. It is visited by tourists for its views and natural environment.

At Bayint Nyi cave (literally: "King's Younger Brother cave"), a climbing site developed with support from The Technical Climbing Club of Myanmar (TCCM) and a number of expats in Yangon who belong to Myanmar Rock Community (MRC), is an ongoing project that started in 2015. The club is now beginning to attract interest from local people which is helping fuel a growing interest in the sport of rock climbing around Myanmar.
