= Thit Hta Man Aung Pagoda =

Buddhist temple in Kayin, Myanmar

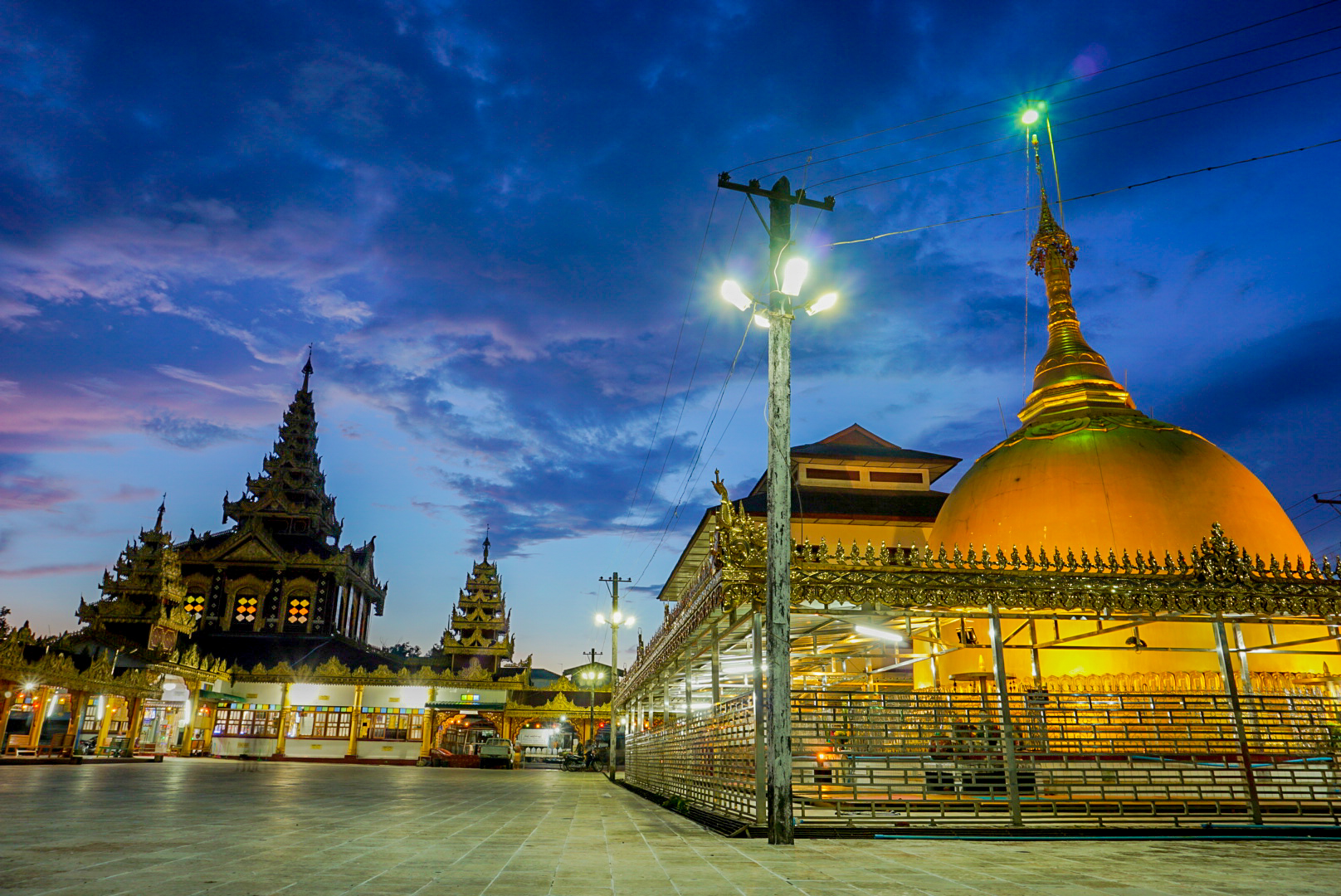
- Thit Hta Man Aung Pagoda (left)

- Location within Myanmar

Religion
- Affiliation: Theravada Buddhism

Location
- Location: Hpa-an, Kayin State
- Country: Myanmar
- Coordinates: 16°53′22″N 97°38′11″E

Architecture
- Founder: U Adi Isran and Karen people
- Completed: 1919

Thit Hta Man Aung Pagoda (သေဋ္ဌမာရ်အောင်ဘုရား) is a Buddhist temple located at the corner of General Street in the northern part of Hpa-an, Kayin State, Myanmar. Thit Hta Man Aung Buddha image is depicted in this temple, and has long been believed to grant the wishes of its worshippers. Casting of the Buddha image started in 1919 under the patronage of U Adi Isran, the abbot of the Ye Monastery, and was finished by 1922. The statue contains 4,600 pieces of copper and is 9 metres (30 ft) high. The statue represents the Buddha who conquered "the five mental hindrances" and named it "Thit Hta Man Aung". The Pagoda Festival is held every year in the month of Tabodwe.
