= Kan Thar Yar Lake =

Lake in Myanmar

- ကန်သာယာရေကန် (Burmese)
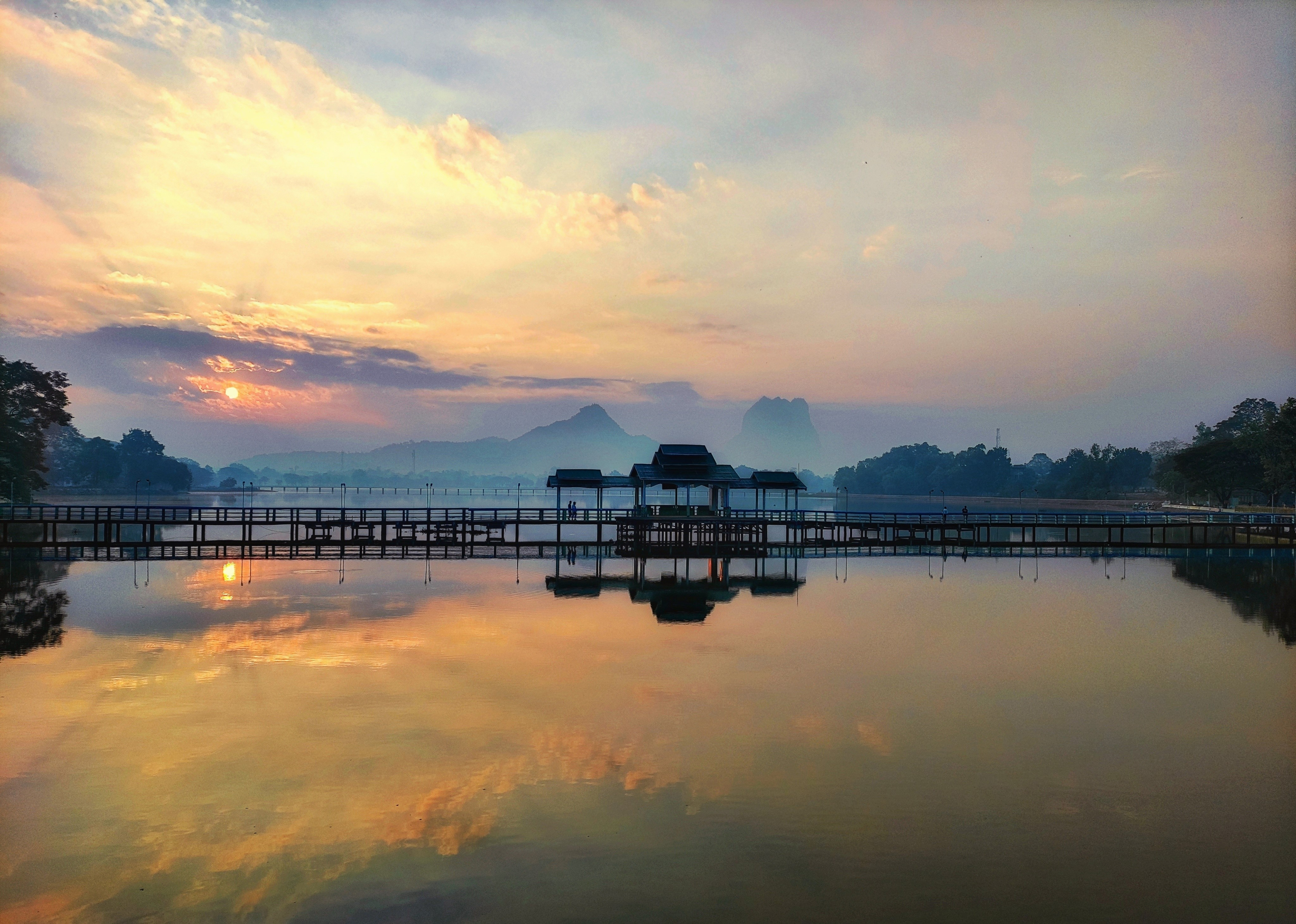
- Kan Thar Yar Lake and bridge

- Location within Myanmar
- Location: Hpa-an, Kayin State
- Coordinates: 16°52′48″N 97°38′03″E
- Type: Reservoir
- Basin countries: Myanmar
- Surface area: 100 acres (40 ha)

Kan Thar Yar Lake (ကန်သာယာရေကန်) is the largest lake in Kayin State, Myanmar. The lake is a popular recreational area for tourists and a famous location for romance in popular culture. It is also famous for the Kantharyar Bridge that crosses it. It is located in the center of Hpa-an. Kan Thar Yar Lake is about 100 acres wide.

To attract local and foreign tourists, the Kayin State Government has built a new 12-foot-wide circuit, Zwekabin Park, and a children's playground, as well as waterfalls along the lake's perimeter path. In April 2022, the Kayin State Government used 289 million Myanmar Kyats to build another pedestrian bridge over Kan Thar Yar Lake.

== Sights of interest ==
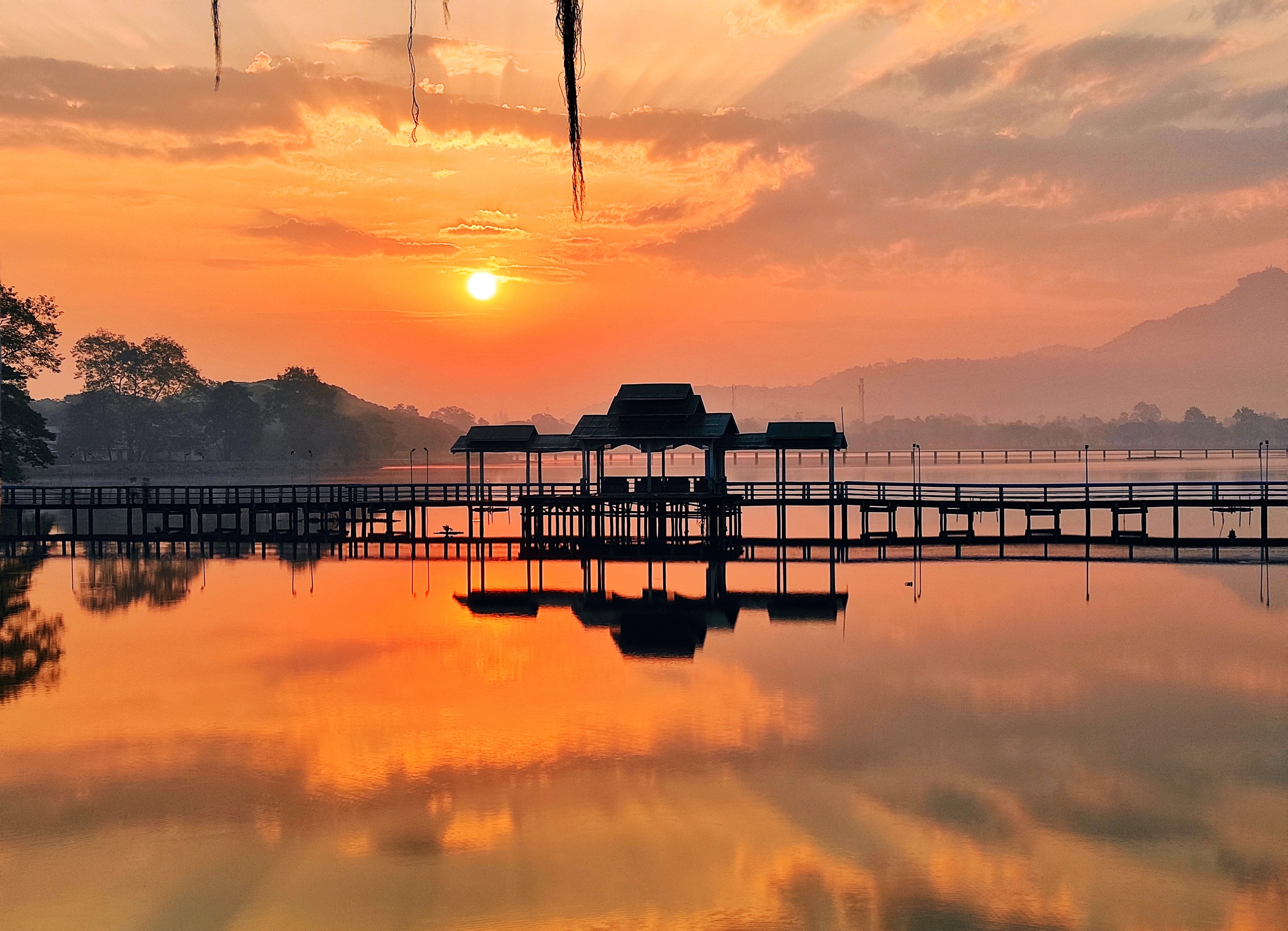
Sunset view of Kan Thar Yar Lake

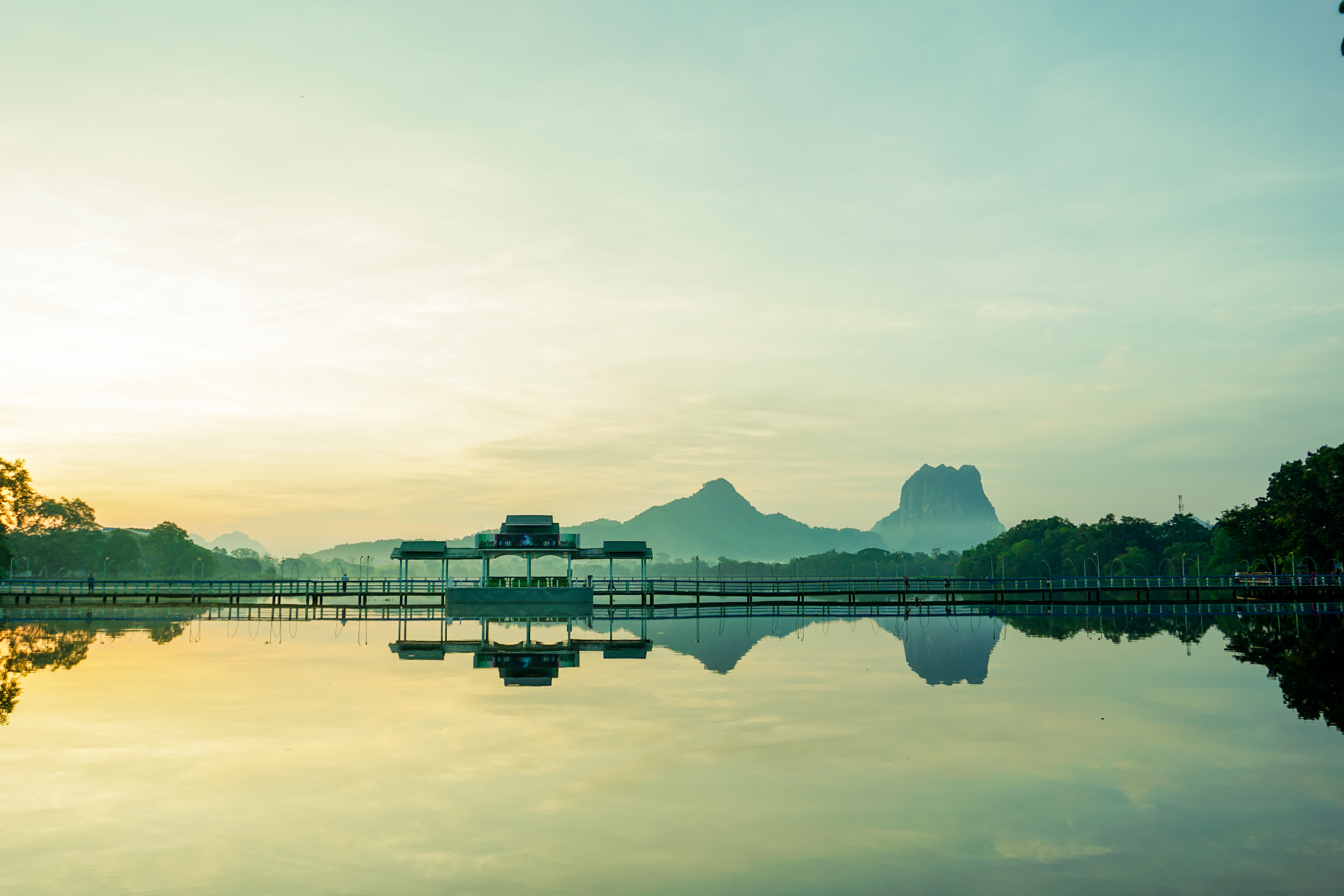
The lake

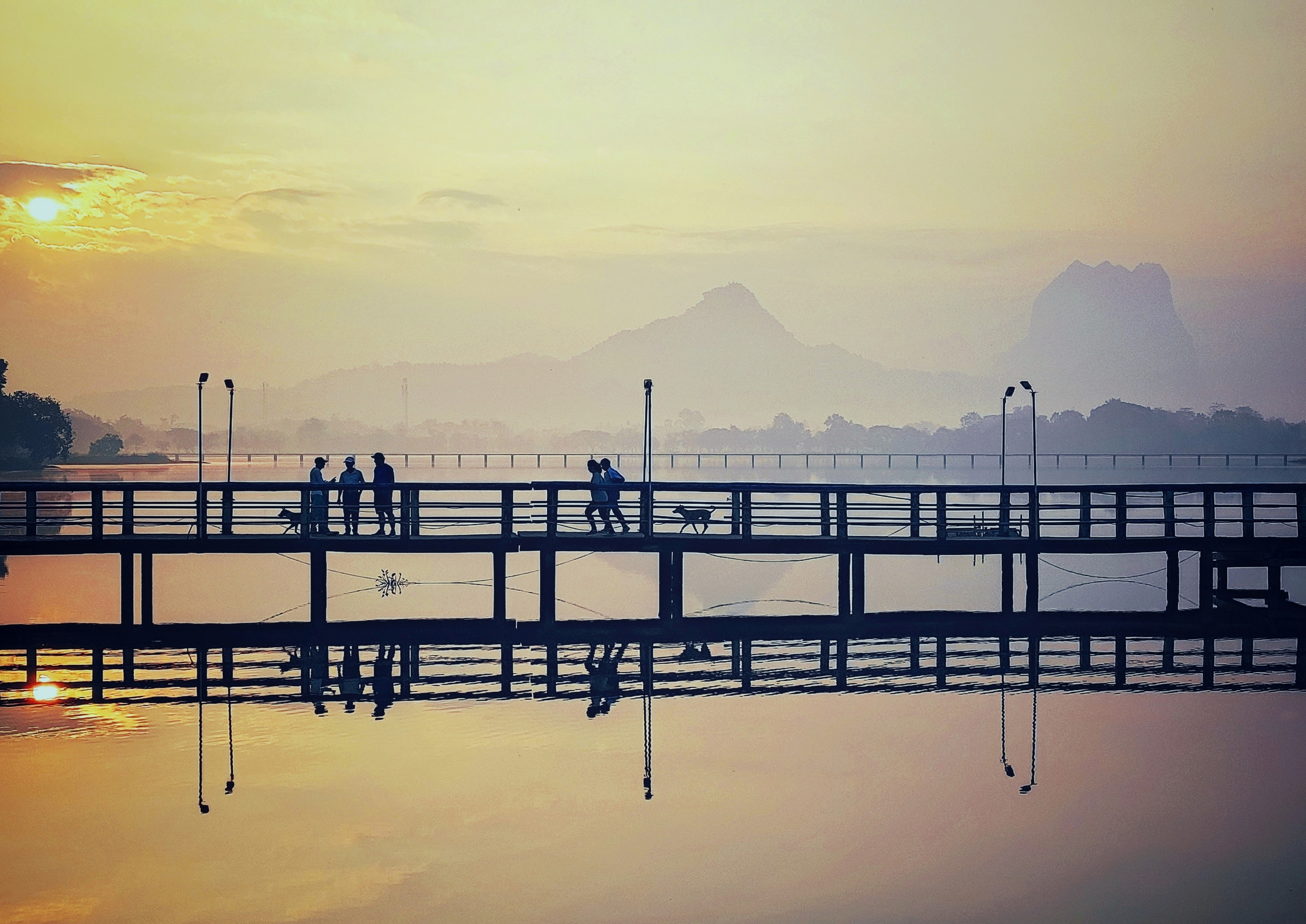
View of Kan Thar Yar
