= Saddan Cave =

Buddhist cave near Hpa-An, Myanmar

Coordinates: 16.74005°N 97.71845°E

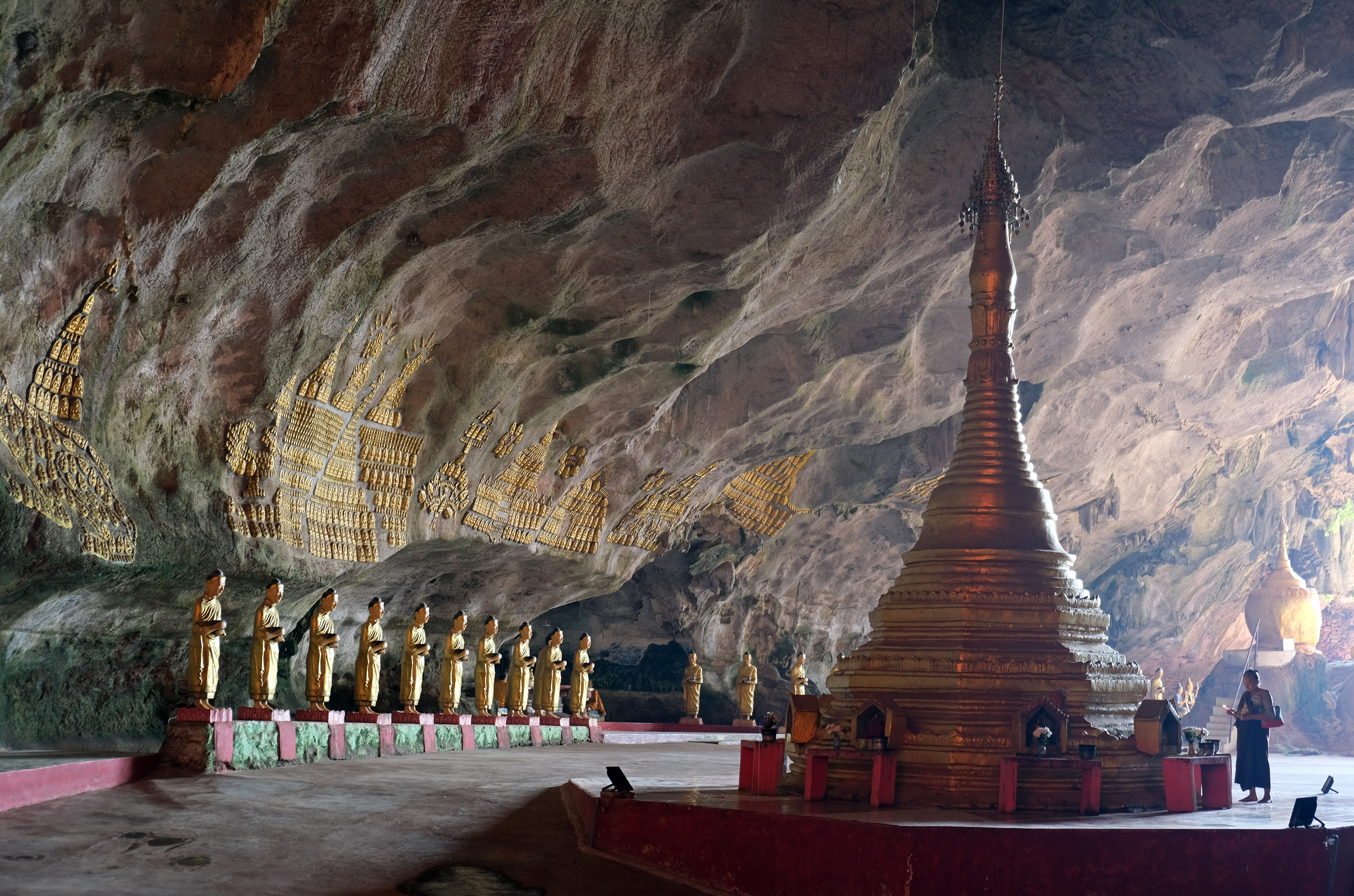
Saddan Cave

Saddan Cave (ဆဒ္ဒန်ဂူ) ထိုင့်မာ့ခၟါ်) is a major Buddhist cave temple with hundreds of small Buddha statues. It is located at the southernmost point of the Zwegabin Mountain range, Hpa-An, Kayin State, Myanmar. Saddan Cave is 107 metres (351 ft) long from east to west and 40 metres (130 ft) wide at its maximum width. It is the longest cave in Karen State with a narrow entrance. The cave is located at a height of about 30 feet (9.1 m) from the ground and has a round shape. The cave is named after Saddan, the king of elephants who lived near the cave. The largest of the stalagmites is called the "Stone Pillar of the King of Elephants". The Saddan Cave Pagoda festival is held every year on the last day of Thingyan. At the exit of Saddan Cave is a large lake, which is said to be King Saddan's bathing lake. Saddan Cave was a resting place for the legendary King Paarwana (ပအာဝနမင်းကြီး) when he was a hunter, according to Karen legend.

== Gallery ==
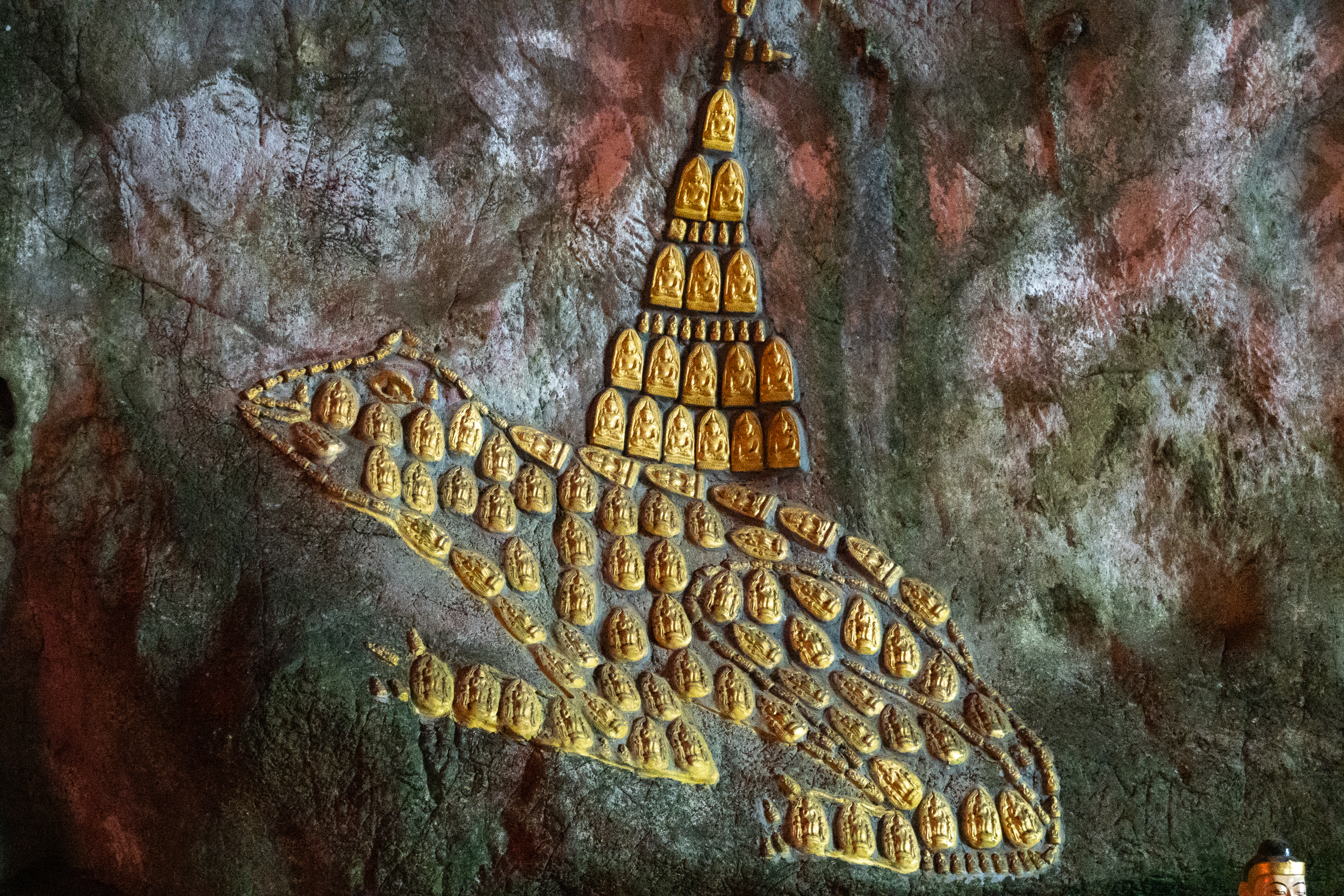
Small Buddha statues

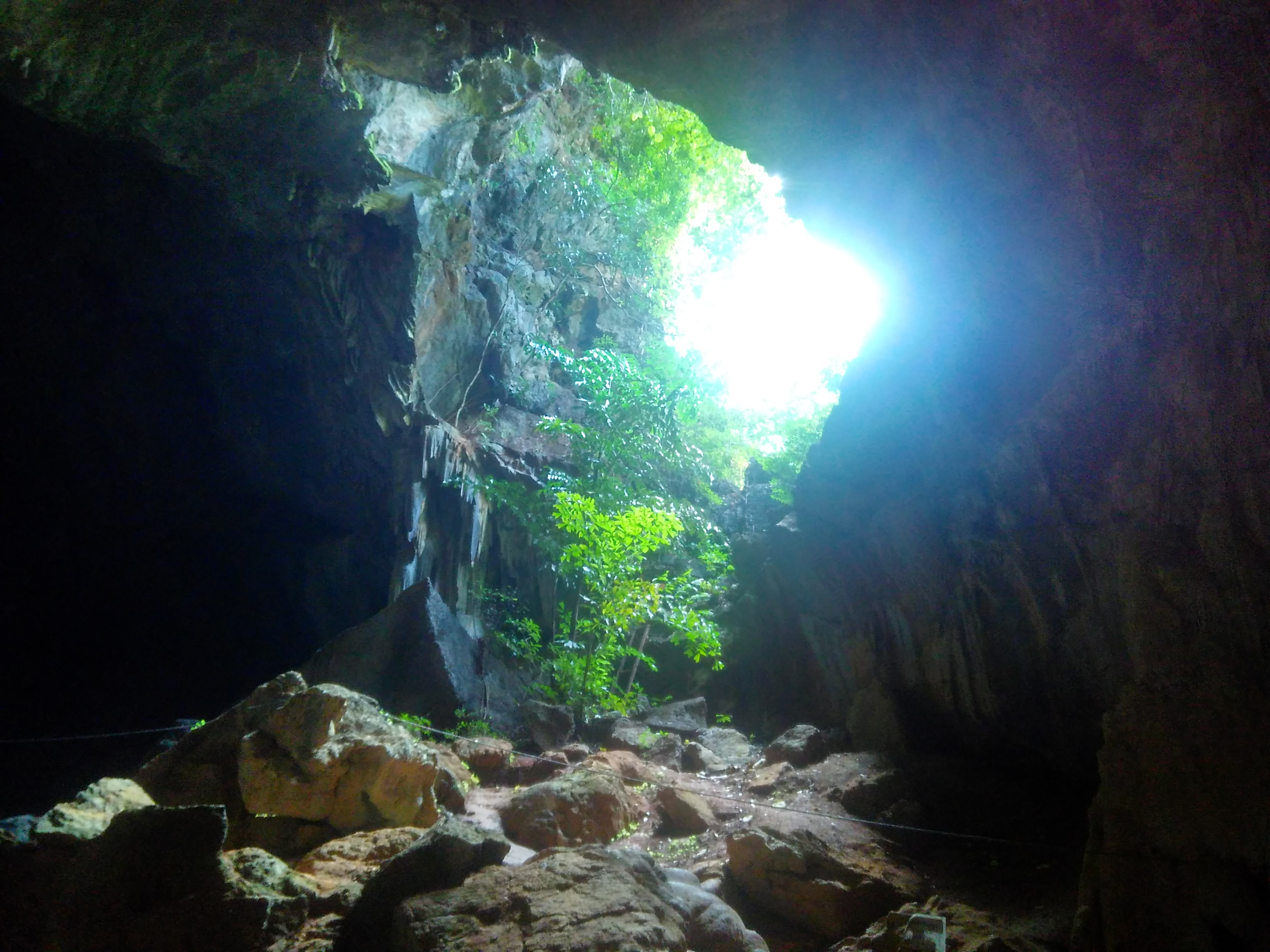
The hole where the hunter shot King Saddan

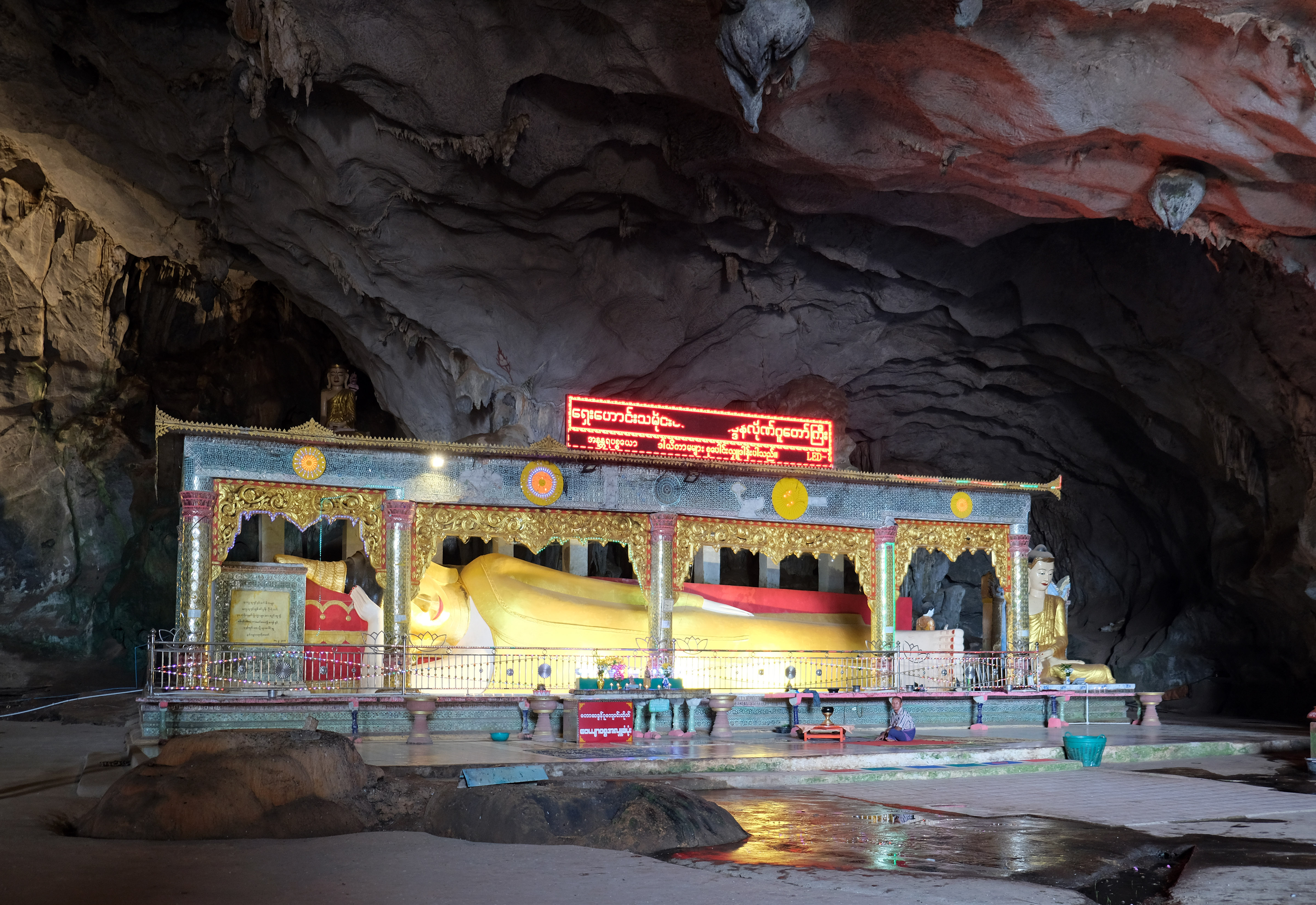
The reclining statue in the cave

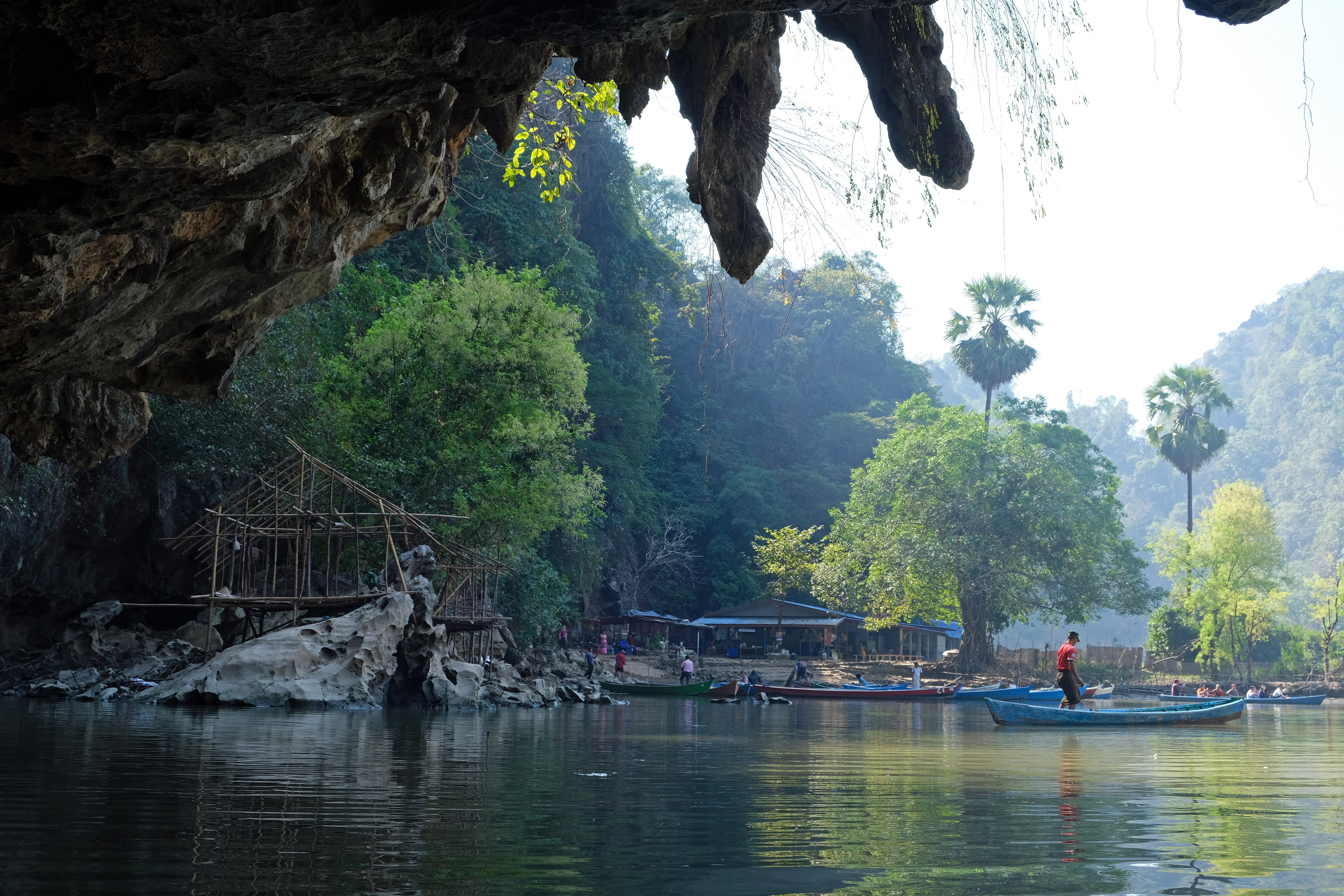
Cave exit

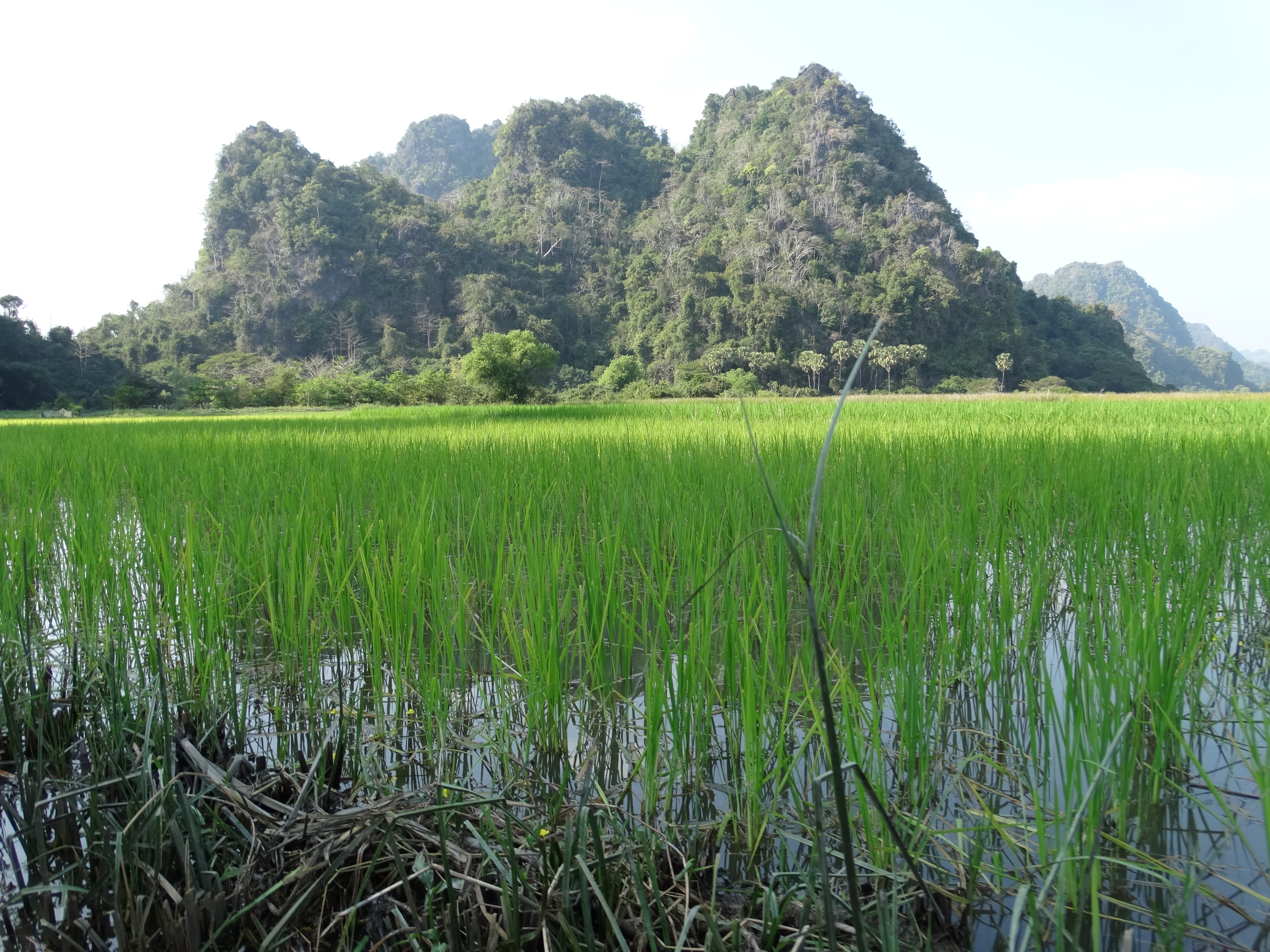
View outside Saddan Cave
