= Cyrtodactylus taungwineensis =

Scientific classification
- Domain: Eukaryota
- Kingdom: Animalia
- Phylum: Chordata
- Class: Reptilia
- Order: Squamata
- Infraorder: Gekkota
- Family: Gekkonidae
- Genus: Cyrtodactylus
- Species: C. taungwineensis

Binomial name
- Cyrtodactylus taungwineensis Grismer, Wood, Quah, Grismer, Thura, Oaks, & Lin, 2020

Species of lizard

The Taung Wine Hill bent-toed gecko (Cyrtodactylus dattkyaikensis) is a species of gecko endemic to Myanmar.
