= Shweyinhmyaw Pagoda =

Buddhist temple in Kayin, Myanmar

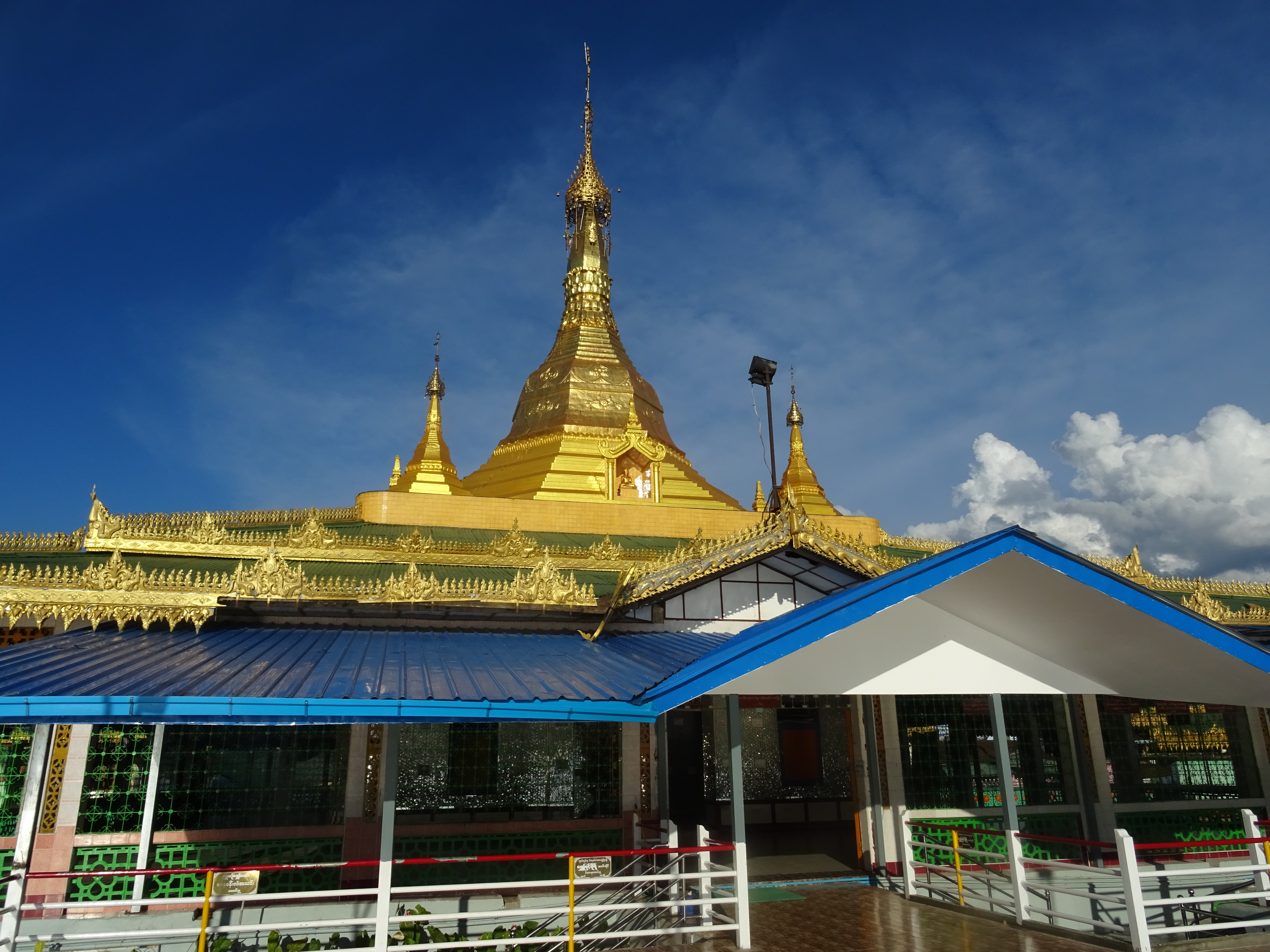
- Shweyinhmyaw Pagoda

- Location within Myanmar

Religion
- Affiliation: Theravada Buddhism

Location
- Location: Hpa-an, Kayin State
- Country: Myanmar
- Coordinates: 16°53′38″N 97°37′52″E

Architecture
- Founder: Queen Sawnanwai
- Completed: unknown

Shweyinhmyaw Pagoda (ရွှေရင်မျှော်ဘုရား, also spelt Shwe Yin Myaw Pagoda) is a Buddhist temple in Hpa-an, Kayin State, Myanmar. The pagoda lies on the bank of the Thanlwin River. It is the most well-known structure in Hpa-An and a popular location for tourists to see the sunset.

== Legend ==
Legend has it that the pagoda was built by a weizza (who married a dragon princess) and his daughter Queen Sawnanwai, as well as his son, a dragon king, who became nats (spirits) after they died a violent death. The dragon king and his enemy, the giant frog king, formed Hpa-an. The pagoda's grounds contain impressive statues of these legendary figures.

== Gallery ==
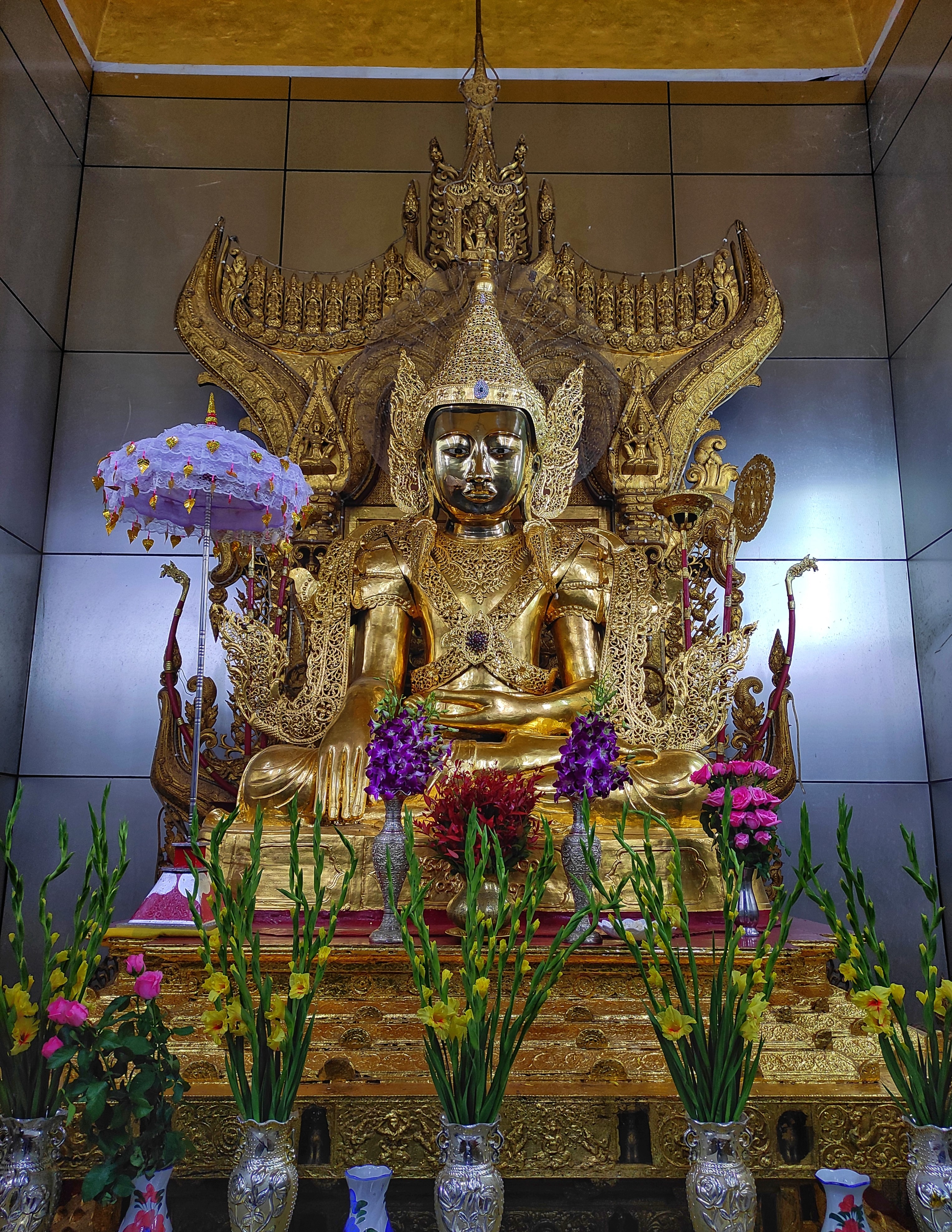
Shwe Yin Myaw Buddha Image

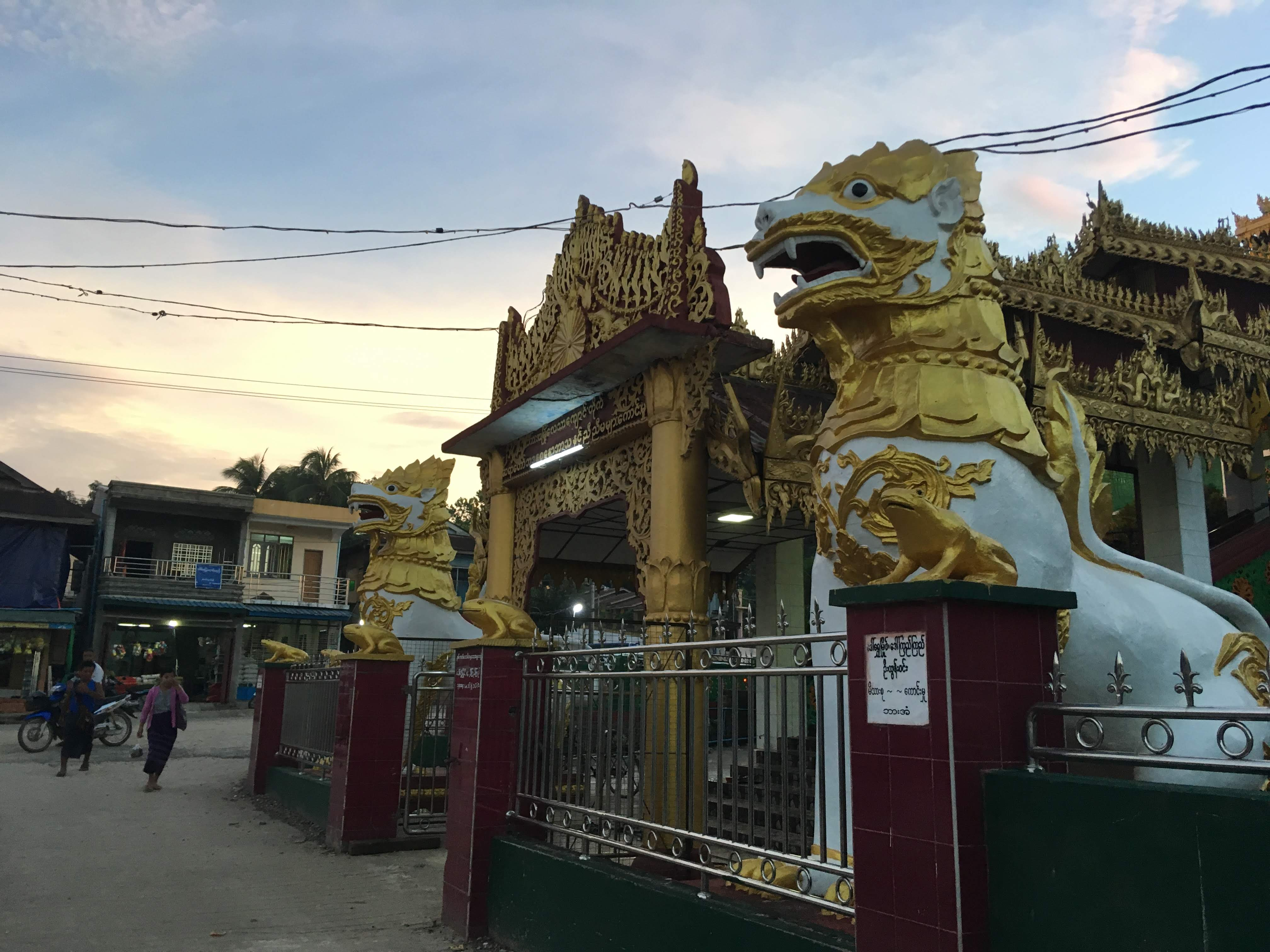
Entrance of the Shwe Yin Myaw Pagoda

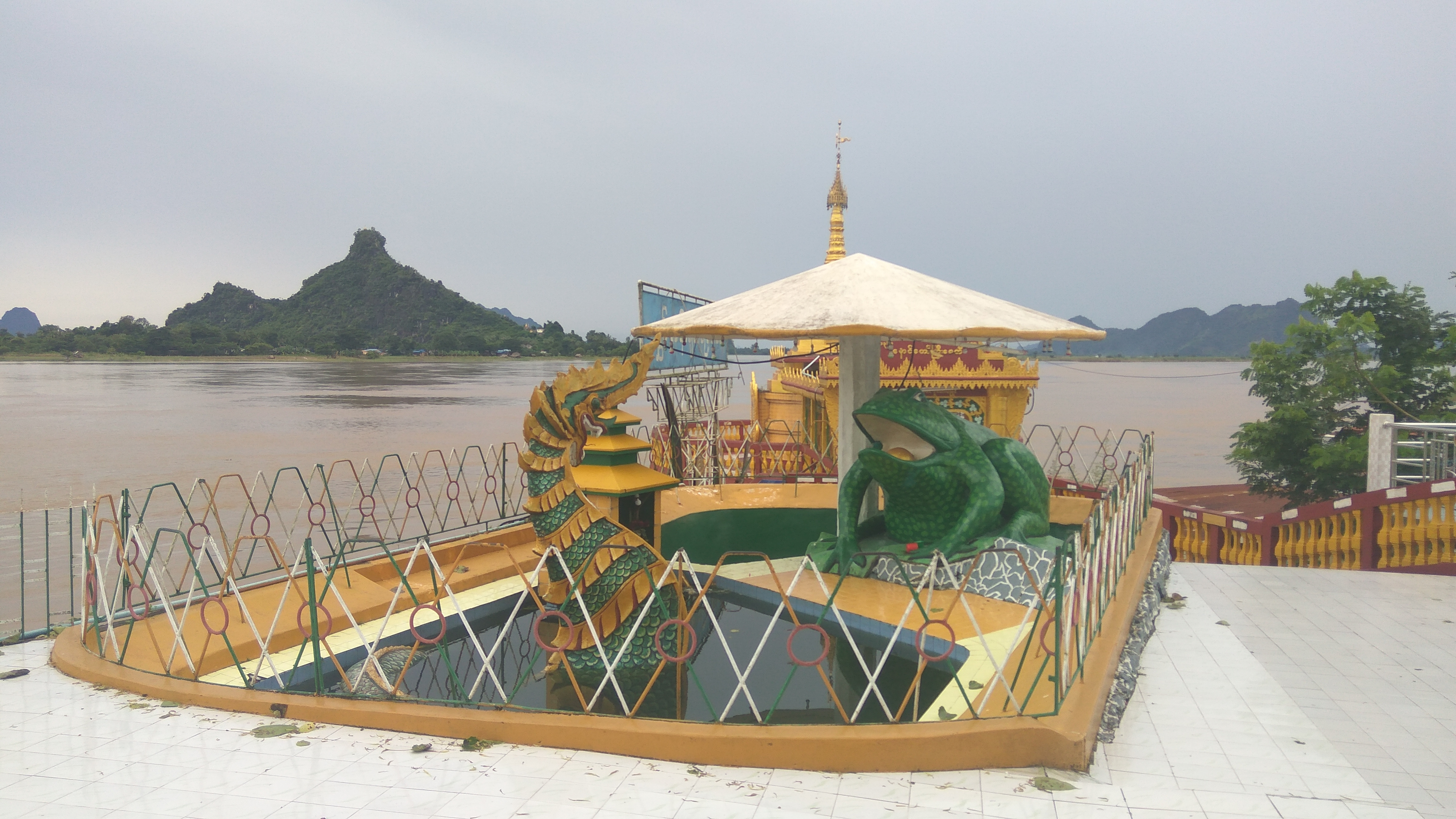
The dragon and giant frog statues

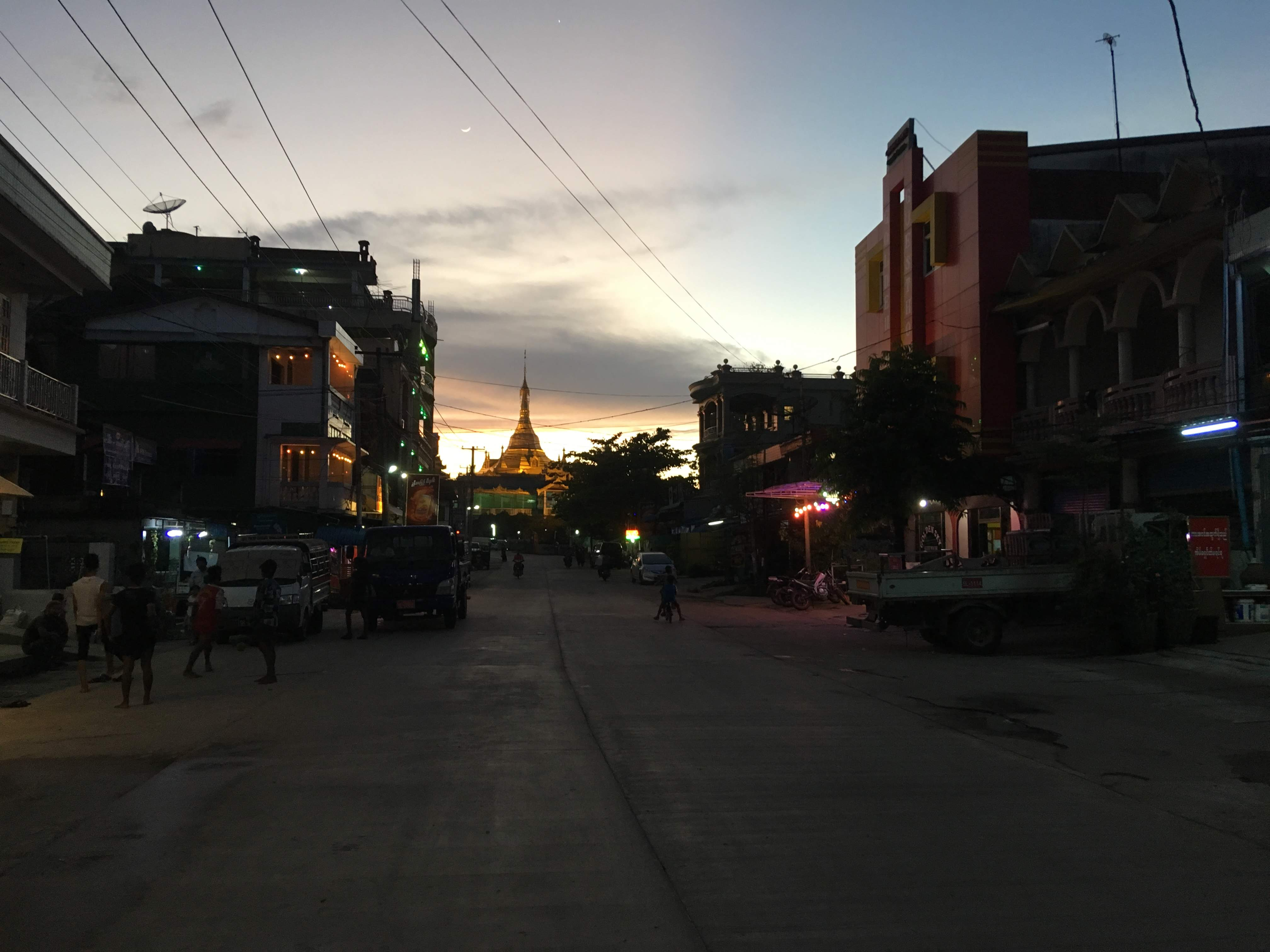
Night view from the Thida Street
