= List of Buddhist temples in Myanmar =

This is a list of Buddhist temples, monasteries, stupas, and pagodas in Myanmar. The country is known as the "Golden Land" for its tens of thousands of Buddhist temples, including around 1,000 covered in gold.

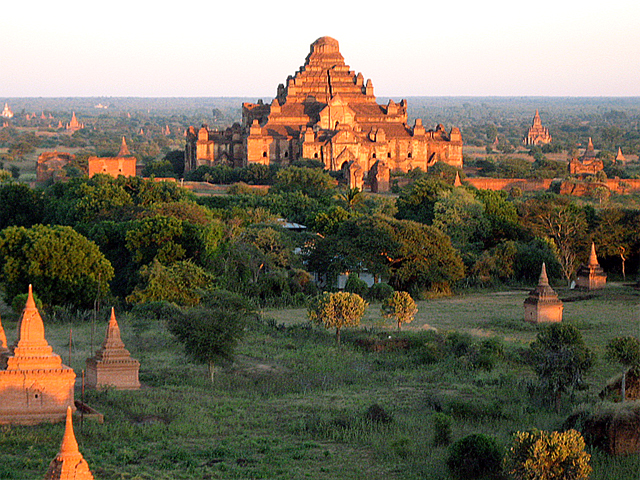
Dhammayangyi Temple – a pyramid-shaped Buddhist temple

== Ayeyarwady Region ==
=== Ngapudaw ===
- Mawtinzun Pagoda

=== Pathein ===
- Phaung Daw U Pagoda (Pathein)
- Shwemokhtaw Pagoda

== Bago Region ==
=== Bago ===
- Kalyani Ordination Hall
- Kyaikpun Buddha
- Mahazedi Pagoda
- Shwemawdaw Pagoda
- Shwethalyaung Buddha (Reclining Buddha)

=== Pyay ===
- Shwesandaw Pagoda (Pyay)

=== Taungoo ===
- Myazigon Pagoda

== Kayah State ==
- Taung Kwe Pagoda

== Kayin State ==
=== Hpa-an ===
- Kawgun Cave
- Kyauk Ka Lat Pagoda
- Saddan Cave
- Shwe Yin Myaw Pagoda
- Thit Hta Man Aung Pagoda

== Magway Region ==
=== Magway ===
- Myathalun Pagoda

=== Pakokku ===
- Tantkyitaung Pagoda
- Thihoshin Pagoda

=== Yesagyo ===
- Pakhannge Monastery

== Mandalay Region ==
=== Amarapura ===
- Kyauktawgyi Pagoda
- Mahagandhayon Monastery
- Nagayon Pagoda
- Pahtodawgyi

=== Bagan (Pagan) ===
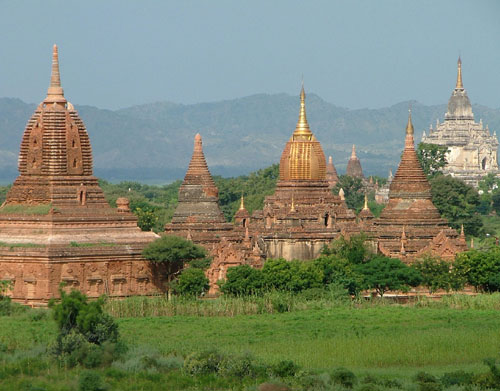
Ancient pagodas are built in the Mon style, Bagan

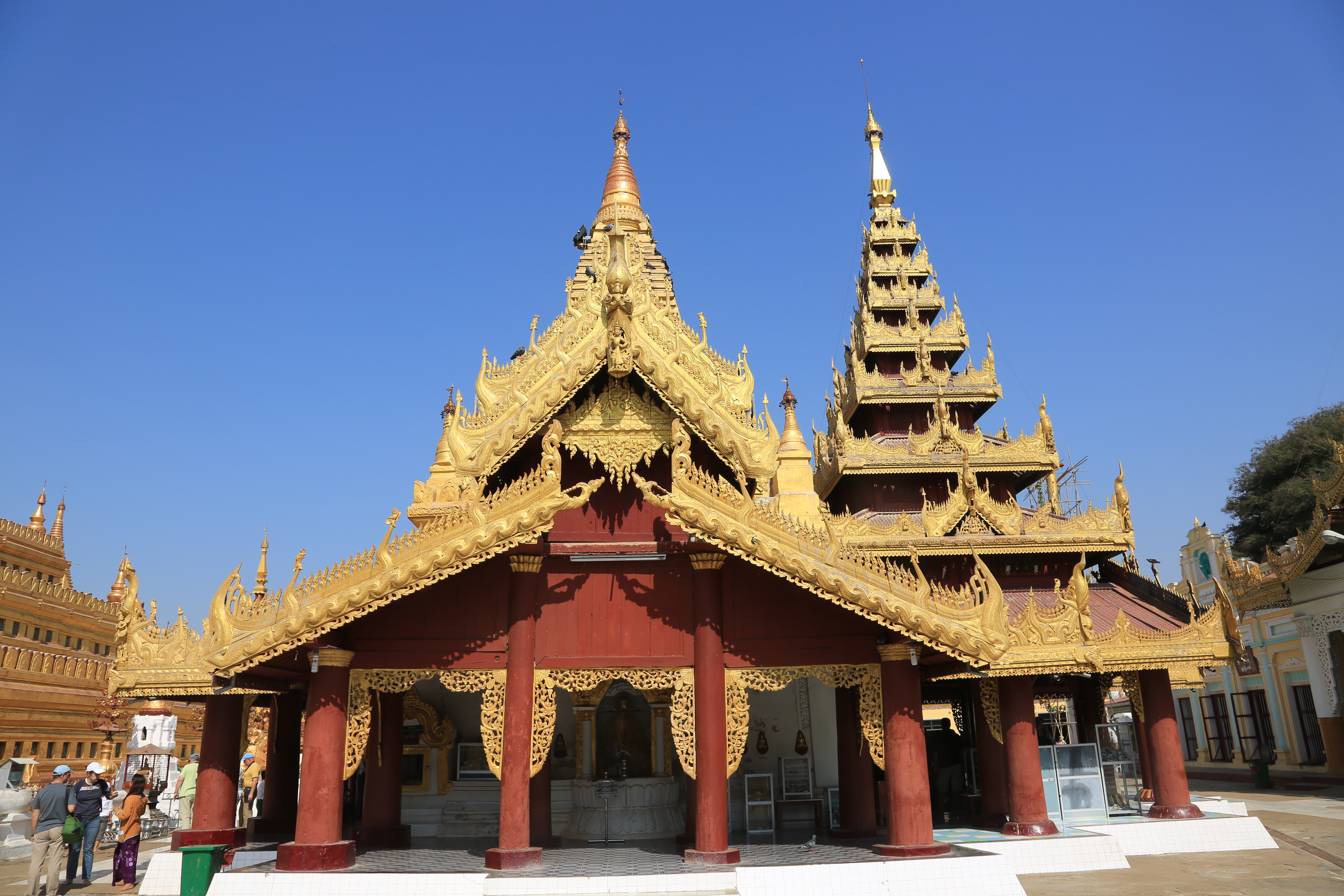
Shwezigon Pagoda in Bagan

- Alodawpyi Pagoda
- Ananda Temple
- Bupaya Pagoda
- Dhammayangyi Temple
- Dhammayazika Pagoda
- Gawdawpalin Temple
- Htilominlo Temple
- Lawkananda Pagoda
- Mahabodhi Temple
- Manuha Temple
- Mingalazedi Pagoda
- Payathonzu Temple
- Shwegugyi Temple
- Shwesandaw Pagoda
- Shwezigon Pagoda
- Sulamani Temple
- Tharabha Gate
- Thatbyinnyu Temple
- Upali Ordination Hall

=== Inwa ===
- Bagaya Monastery
- Lawka Tharahpu Pagoda
- Maha Aungmye Bonzan Monastery

=== Kyaukse ===
- Shwethalyaung Hill
- Shwethalyaung Pagoda
- Tamote Shinpin Shwegugyi Temple

=== Mandalay ===
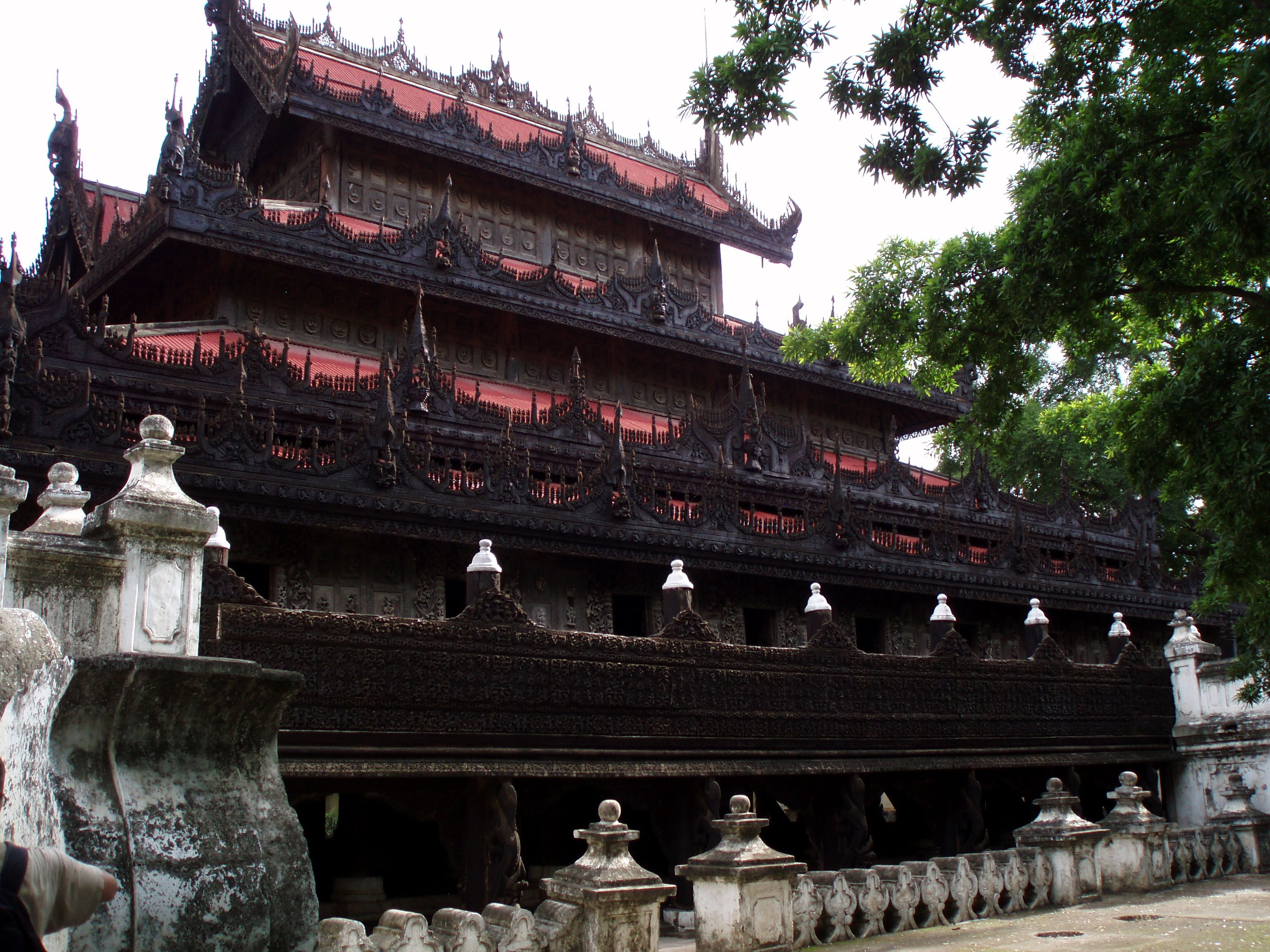
Shwenandaw Monastery in Mandalay

- Atumashi Monastery
- Eindawya Pagoda
- Htilin Monastery
- Kuthodaw Pagoda
- Kyauktawgyi Buddha Temple (Mandalay)
- Mahamuni Buddha
- Myadaung Monastery
- Pitakataik (Mandalay)
- Salin Monastery
- Sandamuni Pagoda
- Setkyathiha Pagoda
- Shwekyimyin Pagoda
- Shwenandaw Monastery
- Taiktaw Monastery
- Tawagu Pagoda
- Yaw Mingyi Monastery

=== Meiktila ===
- Myamyinzu Pagoda

== Mon State ==
- Kaylartha Pagoda
- Kyai Khti Saung Pagoda
- Kyaik Ne Yay Lae Pagoda
- Kyaikthanlan Pagoda
- Kyaiktiyo Pagoda
- Pa-Auk Forest Monastery
- Yadanabonmyint Monastery
- Zinkyaik Pagoda
- Kyaikhtisaung Pagoda

== Naypyidaw Union Territory ==
- Maha Thetkya Yanthi Buddha
- Phaung Daw U Pagoda (Lewe)
- Thatta Thattaha Maha Bawdi Pagoda
- Uppatasanti Pagoda
- Yan Aung Myin Shwe Lett Hla Pagoda

== Rakhine State ==
=== Mrauk U ===
- Andaw-thein Temple
- Htukkanthein Temple
- Koe-thaung Temple
- Le-myet-hna Temple
- Ratanabon Pagoda
- Shite-thaung Temple
- Sakya-Man-Aung Pagoda
- Zina Man Aung Pagoda
- Lawka Man Aung Pagoda
- Laung Bwann Brauk Pagoda

=== Sittwe ===
- Shwezedi Monastery

== Sagaing Region ==
- Hsinbyume Pagoda
- Htupayon Pagoda
- Kaunghmudaw Pagoda
- Laykyun Sekkya
- Maha Bodhi Tahtaung
- Phowintaung
- Thambuddhe Pagoda

== Shan State ==
- Bawgyo Pagoda, Hsipaw
- Hpaung Daw U Pagoda
- Maha Myat Muni Temple
- Pindaya Caves
- Shwe Indein Pagoda
- Wat Zom Khum
- Nga Phe Chaung

== Tanintharyi Region ==
- Paw Daw Mu Pagoda
- Thein Daw Gyi Pagoda

== Yangon Region ==
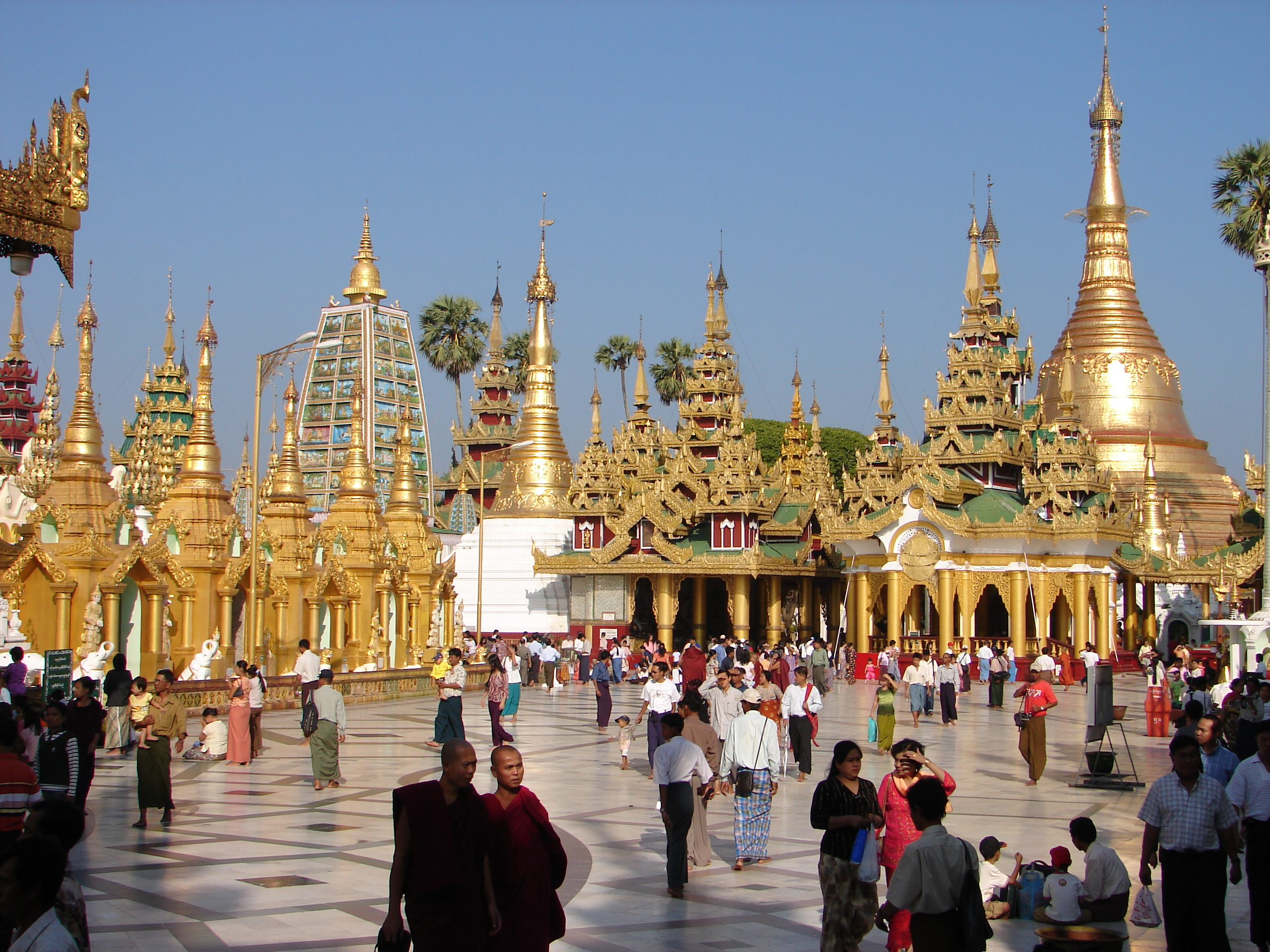
Shwedagon Pagoda in Yangon – the most revered pagoda in Myanmar

=== Hmawbi ===
- Aung Zabu Monastery

=== Twante ===
- Shwesandaw Pagoda (Twante)

=== Yangon (Rangoon) ===
- Botahtaung Pagoda
- Chaukhtatgyi Buddha Temple
- Kaba Aye Pagoda (World Peace Pagoda)
- Kyauktawgyi Buddha Temple (Yangon)
- Maha Wizaya Pagoda
- Ngahtatgyi Buddha Temple
- Shwedagon Pagoda
- Sule Pagoda
- Thayettaw Monastery
- Ye Le Pagoda

== See also ==
- Buddhism in Myanmar
- Pagodas in Burma
- Burmese pagoda
- Kyaung
- Pagoda festival

== Sources ==
- BuddhaNet's Comprehensive Directory of Buddhist Temples sorted by country
- Buddhactivity Dharma Centres database
