= Lawka Man Aung Pagoda =

Buddhist Temple in Myanmar

- လောကမာရ်အောင်စေတီ
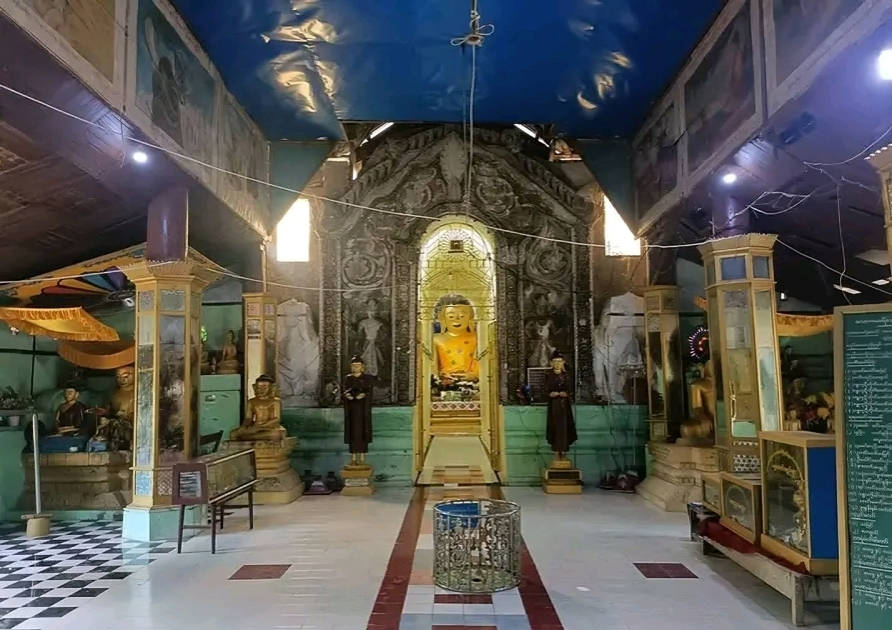
- Statue of Buddha inside the pagoda

- Location within Myanmar

Religion
- Affiliation: Theravada

Location
- Country: Myanmar
- Interactive map of Lawka Man Aung Pagoda
- Coordinates: 20°35′52″N 93°11′29″E

Architecture
- Founder: Sanda Thudhamma of Mrauk-U
- Completed: c. 1658

Lawka Man Aung Pagoda (Burmese: လောကမာရ်အောင်စေတီ) is a Buddhist stupa located in Mrauk U, Rakhine State, Myanmar. It is one of the five notable pagodas collectively known as the "Man Aung Pagodas" (Five Victorious Pagodas), built during the Mrauk U Kingdom.

== History ==
Lawka Man Aung Pagoda was constructed around 1652-1658 CE by King Sanda Thudhamma Raza, the 24rd monarch of the Mrauk U Dynasty. It was built simultaneously with Zeenat Man Aung Pagoda and Ratanamar Aung Pagoda. The name Lawka Man Aung translates to "Conqueror of the World," and commemorates the Buddha's liberation from the three worldly realms: Satta Loka (world of beings), Sankhara Loka (world of mental formations), and Akasa Loka (world of space).

== Architecture ==
The pagoda is like a square-based stone structure, each side of its base measuring 74 feet. Constructed with well-hewn and cemented stone blocks, it features four square tiers. At the center of each side of the tiers is a porch containing a seated Buddha image. The porches, made of stone slabs, bear architectural similarities to the Laungbanpyauk Pagoda and show traces of ornamental carvings.

A 20-foot-high portal on the eastern façade leads into the pagoda via a vaulted passage measuring 4 feet 8 inches wide, 16 feet high, and 29 feet long. This corridor opens into a central chamber containing a 12-foot-high seated Buddha image carved from a single stone block, resting on a stone altar beneath a hemispherical dome ceiling.

The pagoda is enclosed by a 300-foot perimeter wall and rises to a height of 100 feet. Historically, two ancient routes known as the Gold Road and Silver Road. The stupa is built on a square platform, each side measuring approximately 7 feet. The base corners are adorned with lion figures, symbolizing protection, and guinea pig figurines. The structure rises to a height of around 100 feet and includes four terraced levels, each square in shape. Floral carvings are found along the three upper terraces.

== Location ==
The pagoda is situated to the northwest of the former palace site in Mrauk U. It lies approximately 200 cubits northwest of Shwekyar Thein Pagoda and around one mile west of Nannya Kun (Royal Hill), near Kyauk Yit Creek.

== See also ==
- List of temples in Mrauk U
- List of Buddhist temples in Myanmar
