= Sakya-Man-Aung Temple =

Pagoda in Mrauk U, Rakhine, Myanmar

Coordinates: 20°35′41.3″N 93°12′03.3″E

Sakya Man Aung Pagoda သကျမာရ်အောင်စေတီတော်
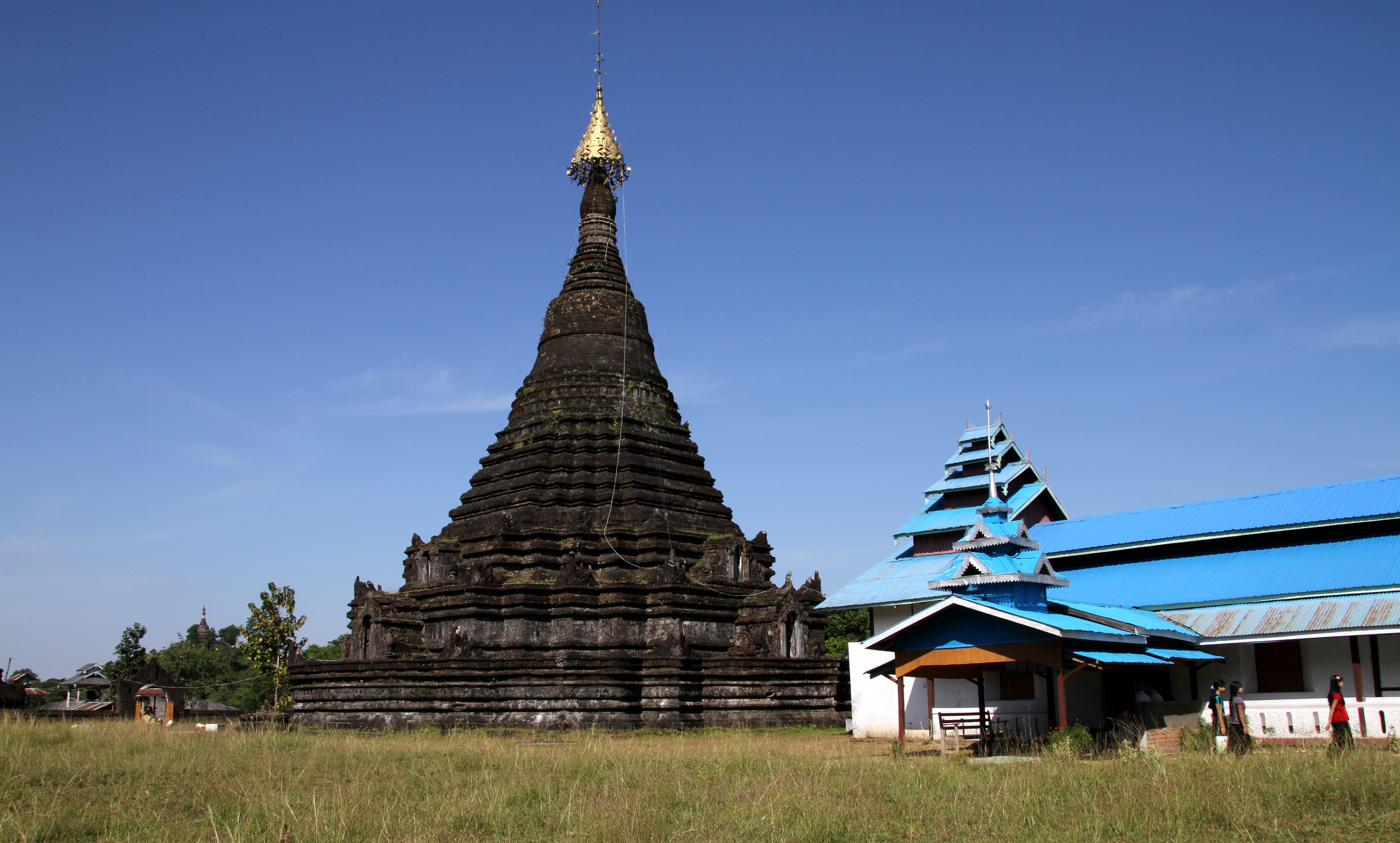
- View of the Temple

- Location within Myanmar

Religion
- Affiliation: Theravada

Location
- Country: Myanmar
- Interactive map of Sakya Man Aung Pagoda သကျမာရ်အောင်စေတီတော်

Architecture
- Founder: Thiri Thudhamma of Mrauk-U
- Completed: c. 1629

The Sakya-Man-Aung Pagoda (also known as Thakkya Man-aung) is a Buddhist temple in Mrauk U, Myanmar, located about one kilometer northeast of the palace. It was built in 1629 during the reign of King Thiri Thudhamma Raza.

== Structure ==
The pagoda grounds are enclosed by a high stone wall. The gate is guarded by two kneeling giants. The stupa's layout is shaped like an eight-petaled lotus flower, with the sides facing the main cardinal directions being longer than the ones in between. The pyramid first rises in an octagonal form, then transitions into a bell shape after nine levels, and is topped with the traditional elements: turban, double lotus, and banana bud, crowned by a gilded hti.

Within the pagoda grounds are several smaller stupas and an ordination hall featuring nine Buddhas seated on altars. The wooden ceiling of the hall is supported by columns with lotus bases and capitals and is decorated with three circular motifs, each surrounding a lotus flower: eight riding figures, then sixteen animals, and finally twelve image segments of various themes.

== Gallery ==
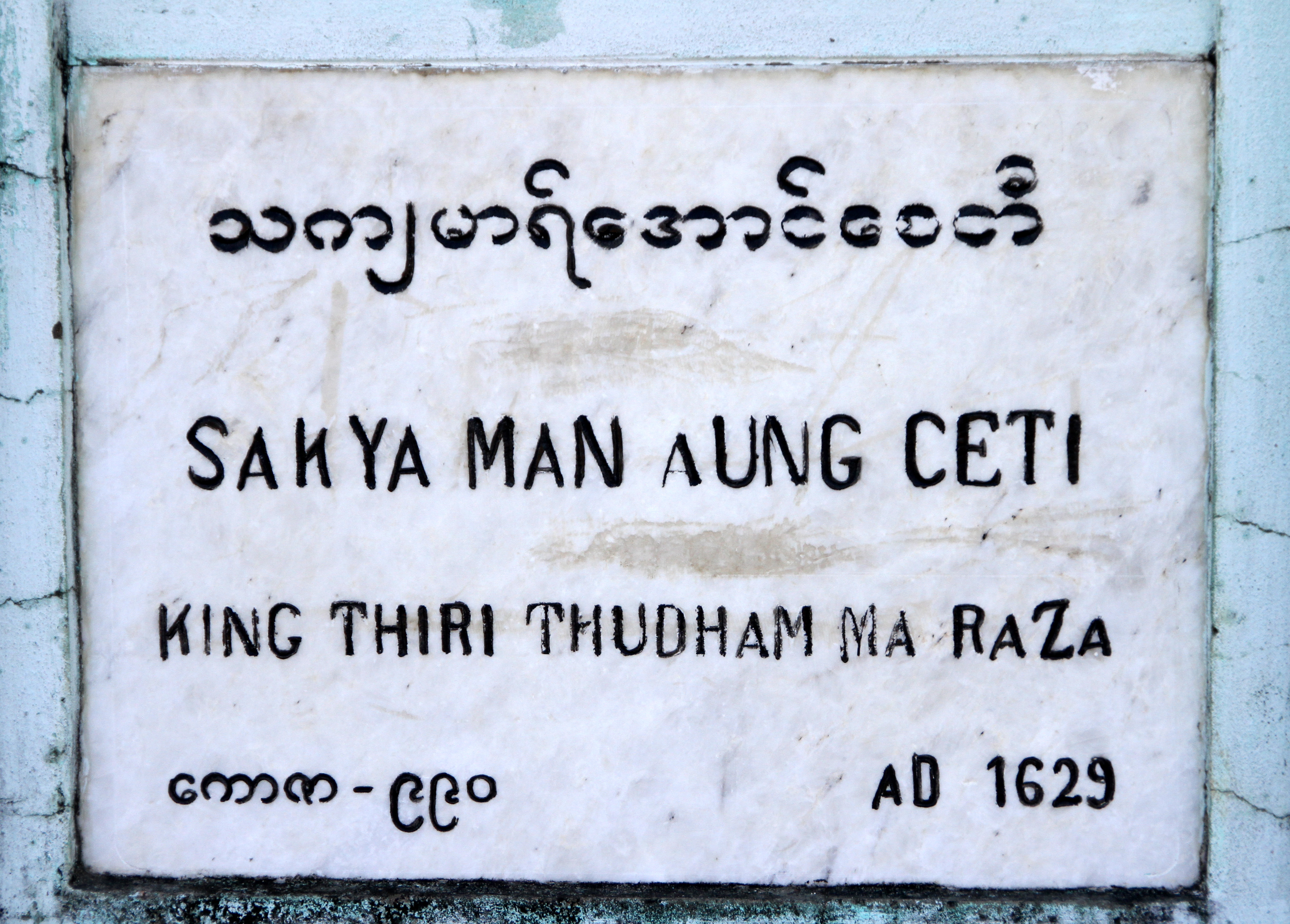
Documentation

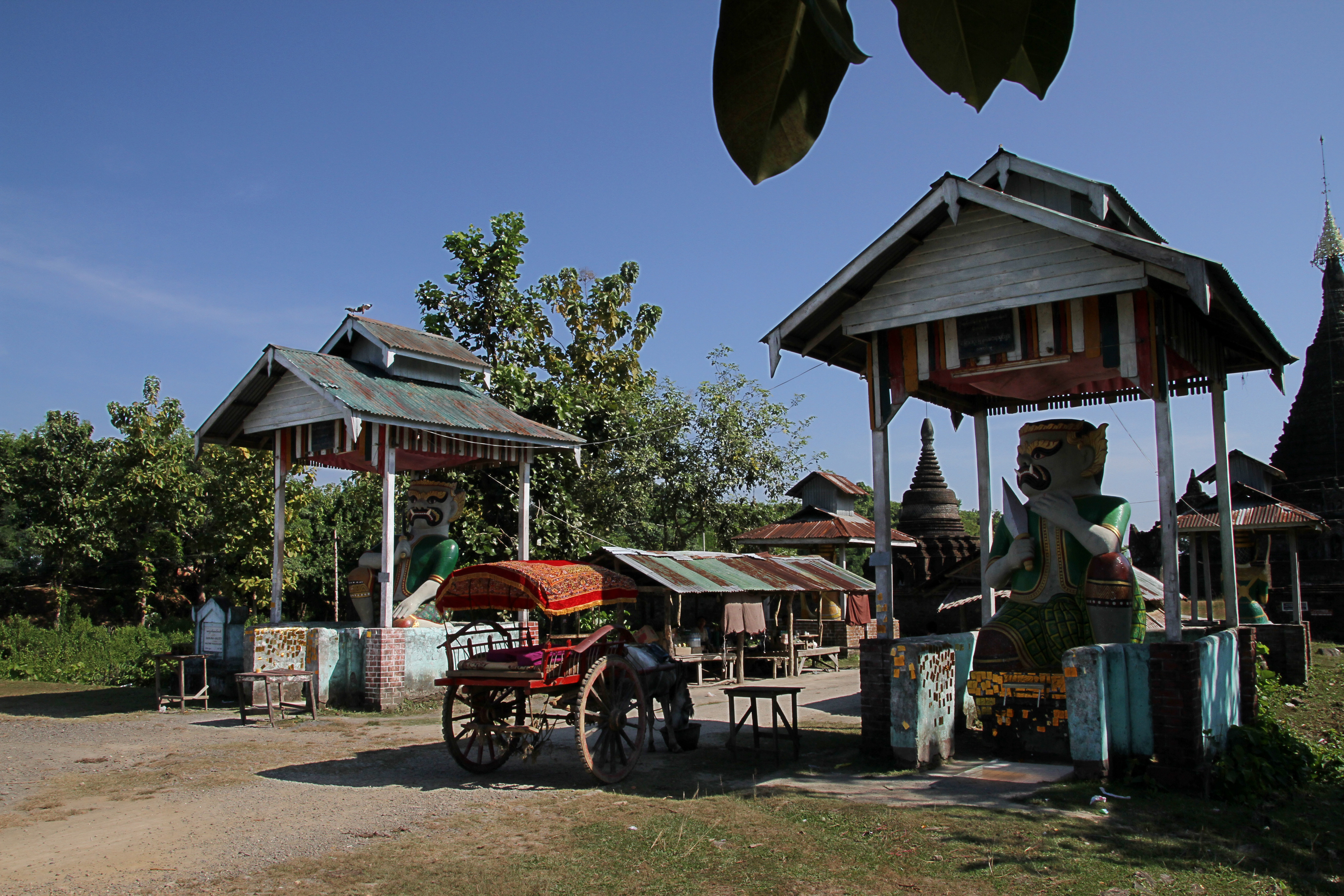
Gate guards

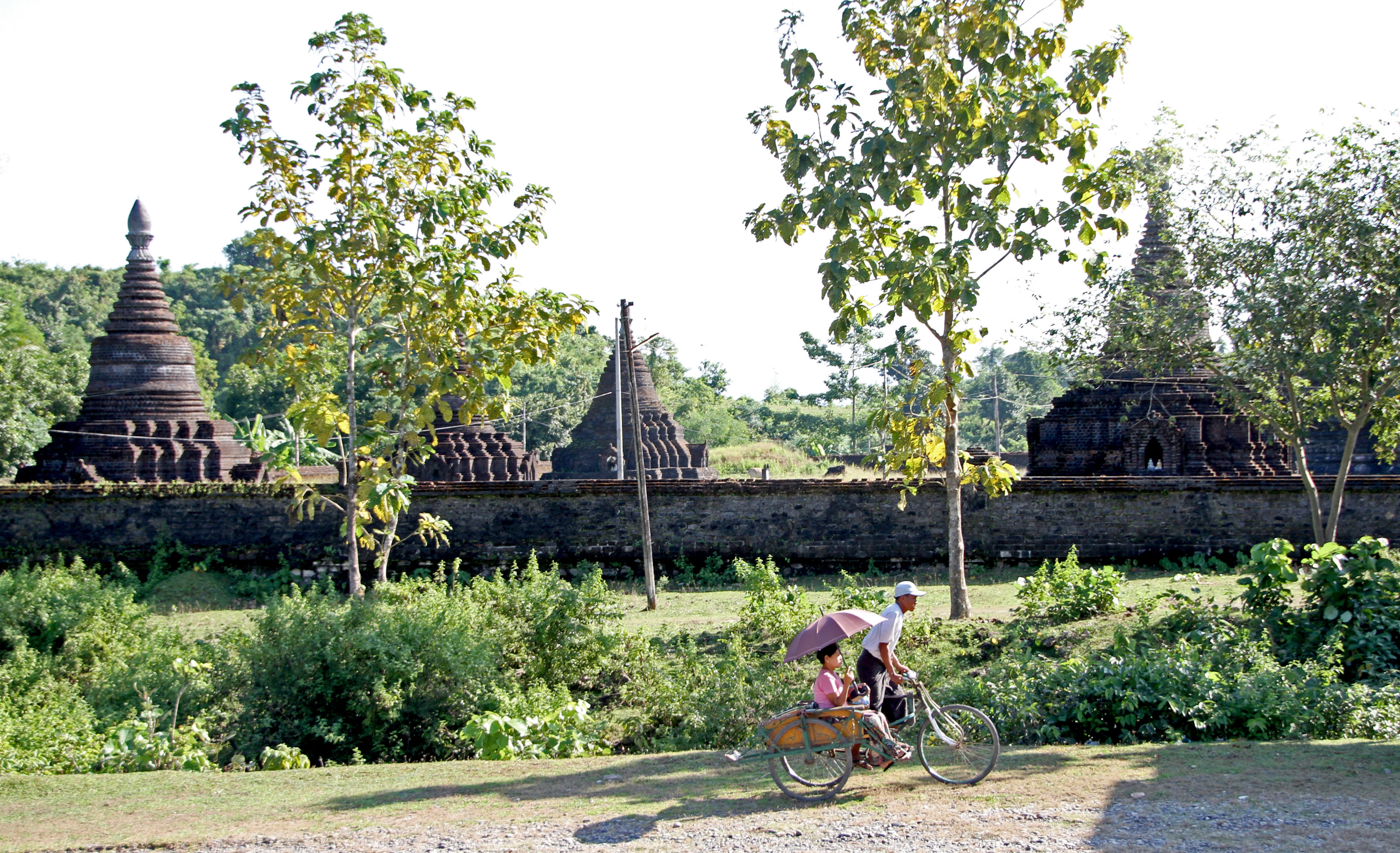
Big and small stupas

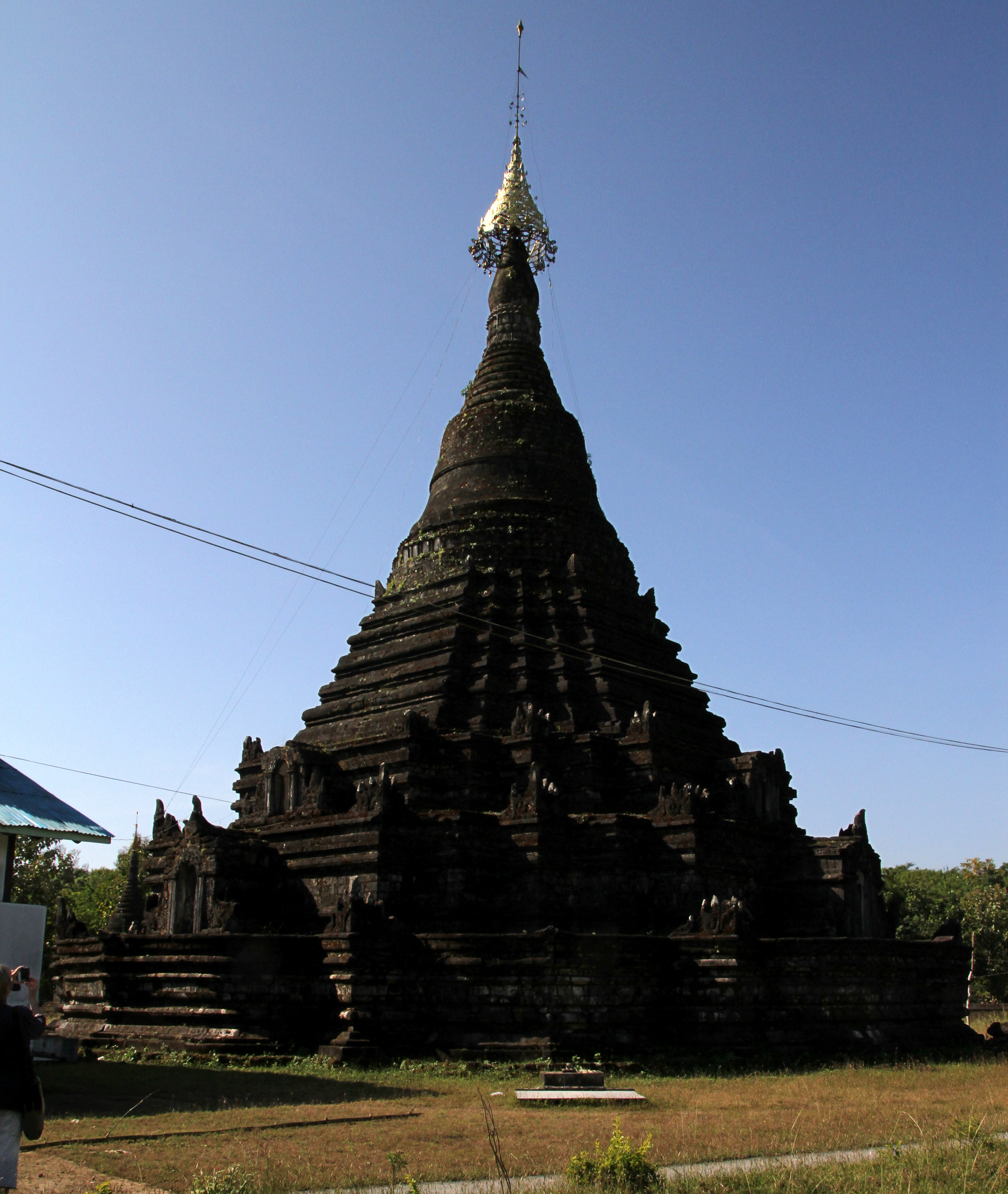
Stupa

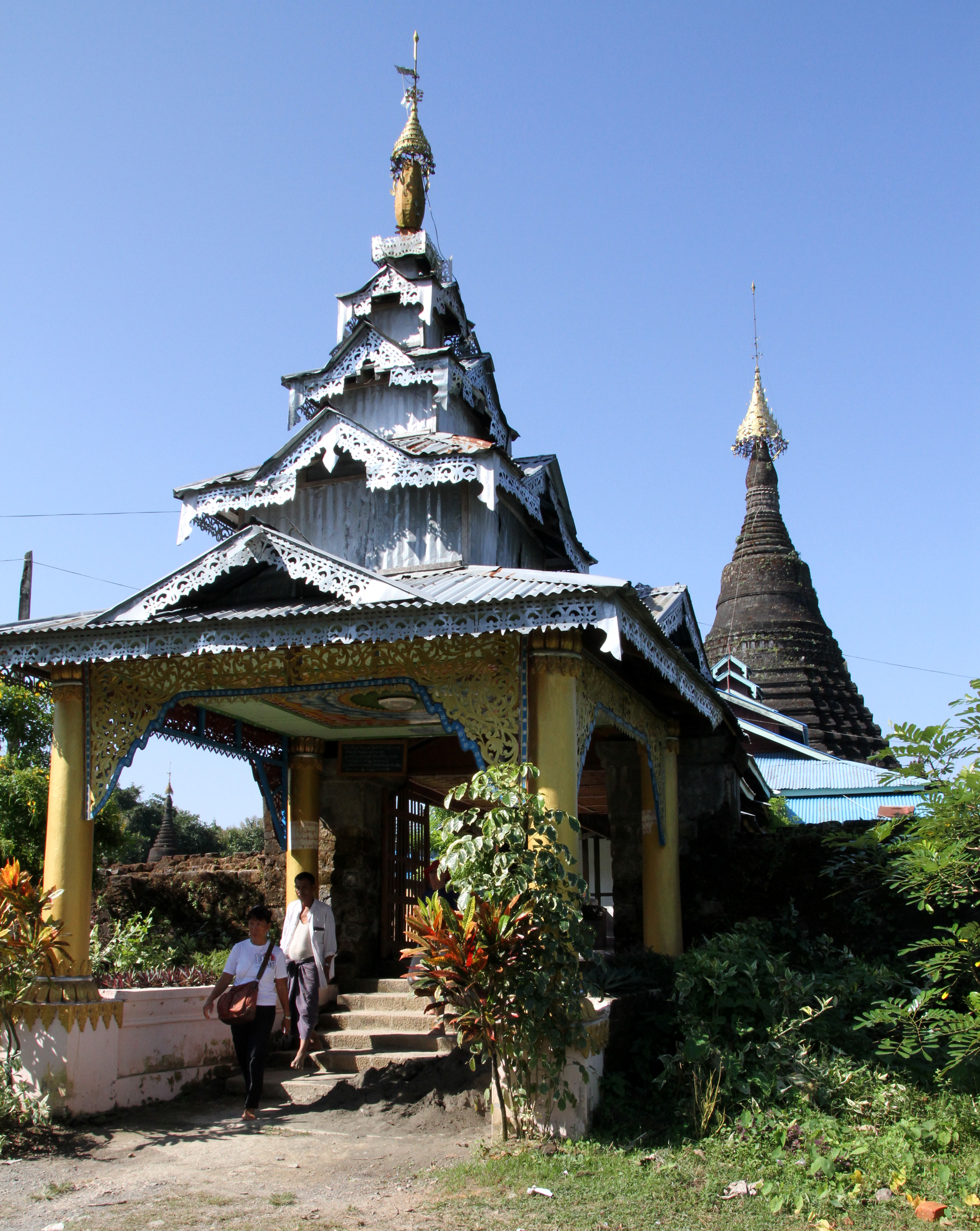
Entrance

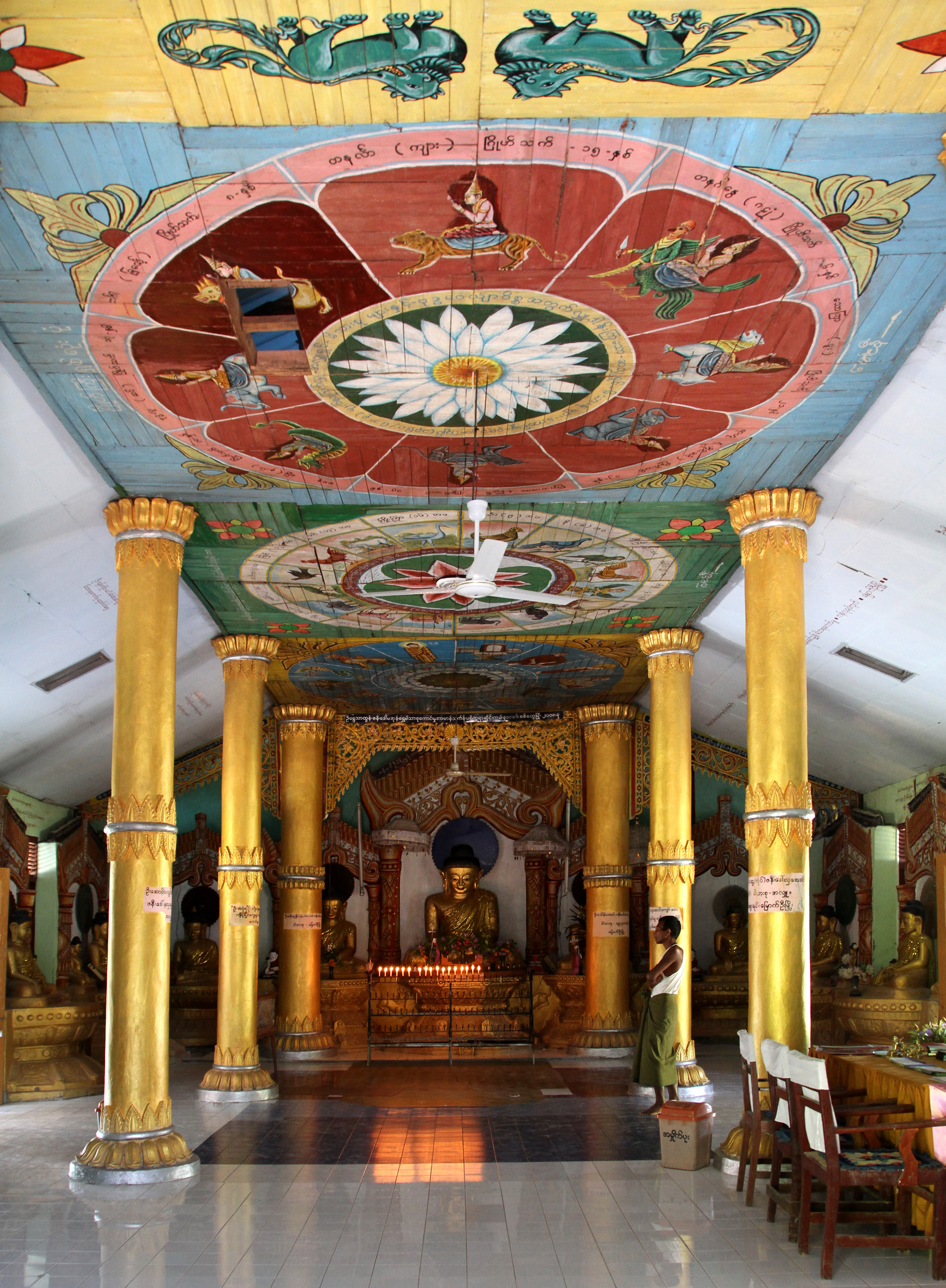
Ordination hall

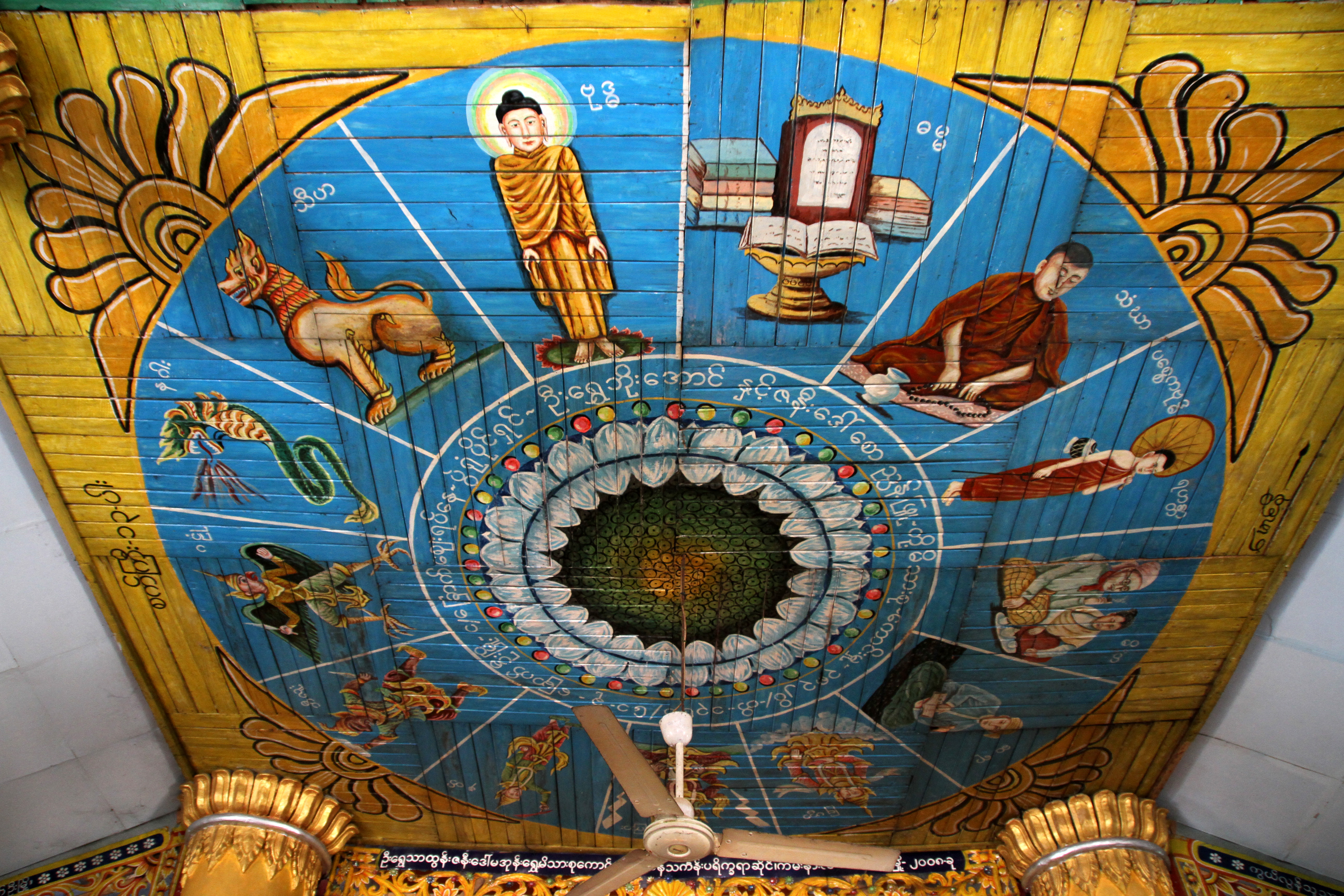
Twelve figures

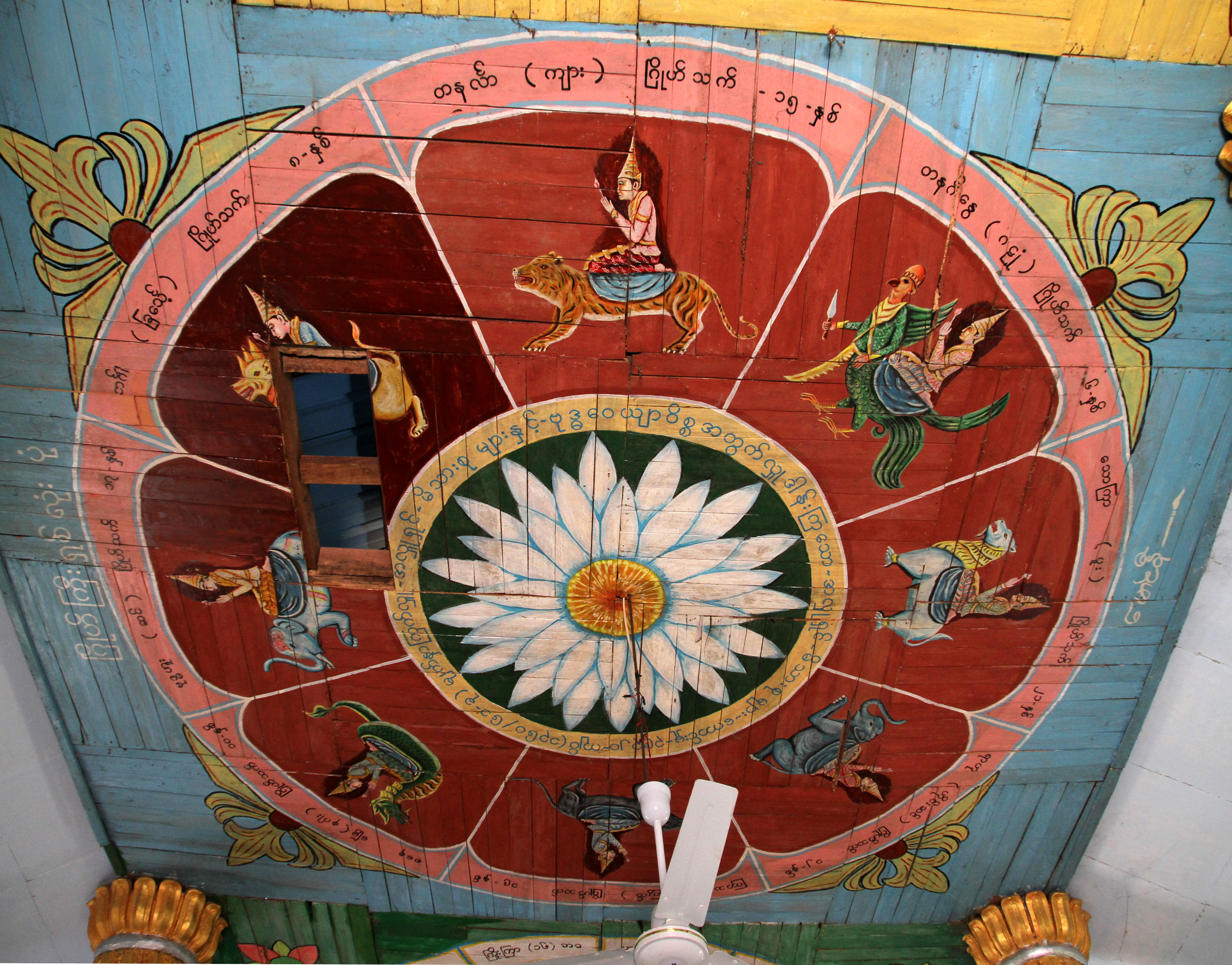
View

== See also ==
- List of Temples in Mrauk U
- List of Buddhist temples in Myanmar
