= Tawagu Pagoda =

Buddhist monastery in Myanmar

- တဝဂူစေတီ
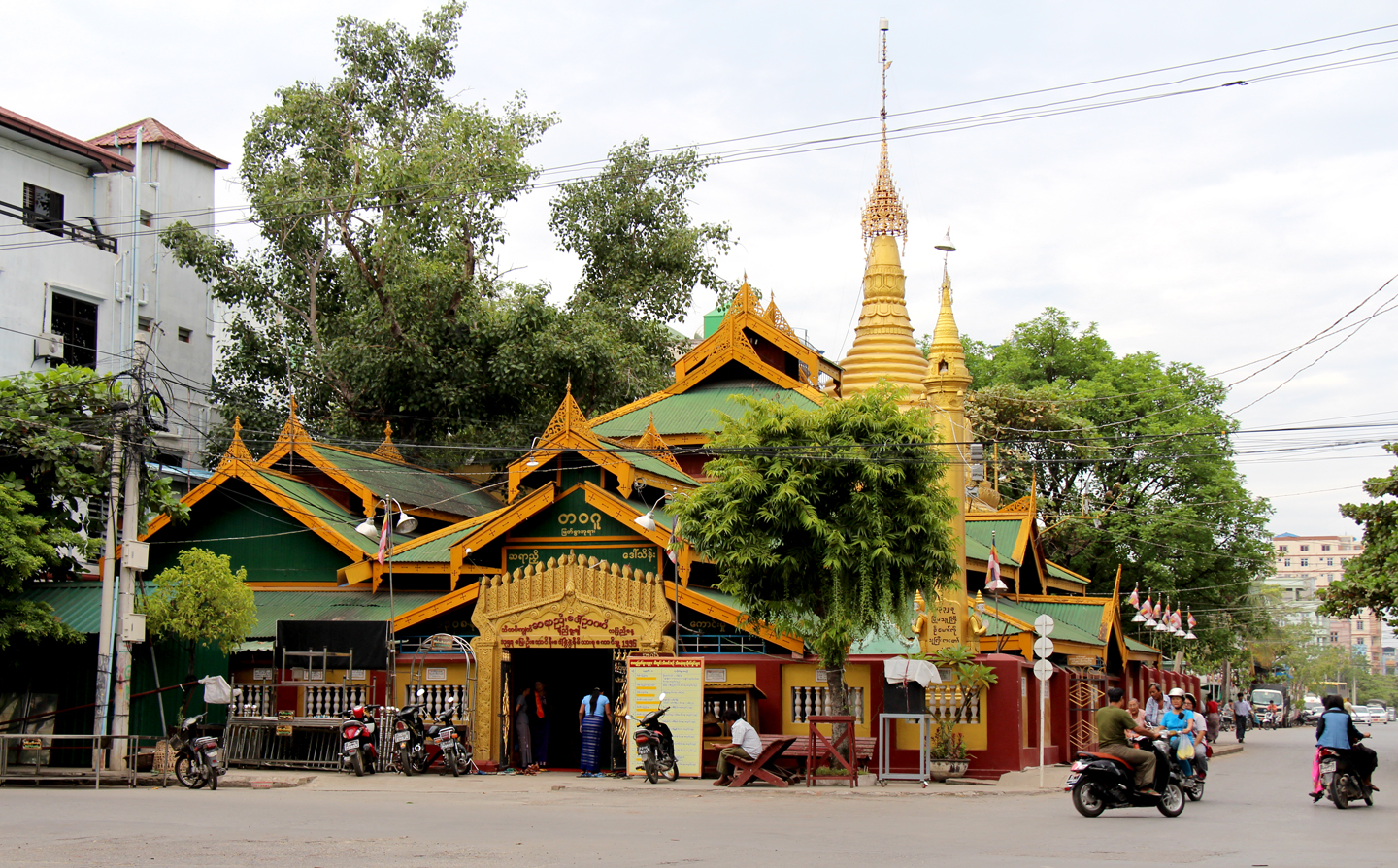

- Tawagu Pagoda

Religion
- Affiliation: Theravada Buddhism

Location
- Country: Mandalay, Myanmar
- Coordinates: 21.991851°N 96.081778°E

Tawagu Pagoda (Burmese: တဝဂူစေတီ) is a Buddhist pagoda in Mandalay, Myanmar (Burma), located at the intersection of 82nd and 20th Streets in Aungmyethazan Township's Palengweyaung ward. The pagoda holds a pagoda festival in the Burmese month of Nadaw.

== Establishment ==
The pagoda was erected by King Shwenankyawshin (1501–1527) during the Innwa era, at the site of a white elephant's abode. The pagoda was subsequently restored by Thibaw Min (1878–1885), the last king of the Konbaung dynasty.

== See also ==
- Kuthodaw Pagoda
- Sandamuni Pagoda
- Setkyathiha Pagoda
- Shwekyimyin Pagoda
- Buddhism in Myanmar
