= Laung Bwann Brauk Pagoda =

Buddhist temple in Mrauk U, Myanmar

Laung Bwann Brauk
- လောင်ဗန်းပြောက်စေတီ
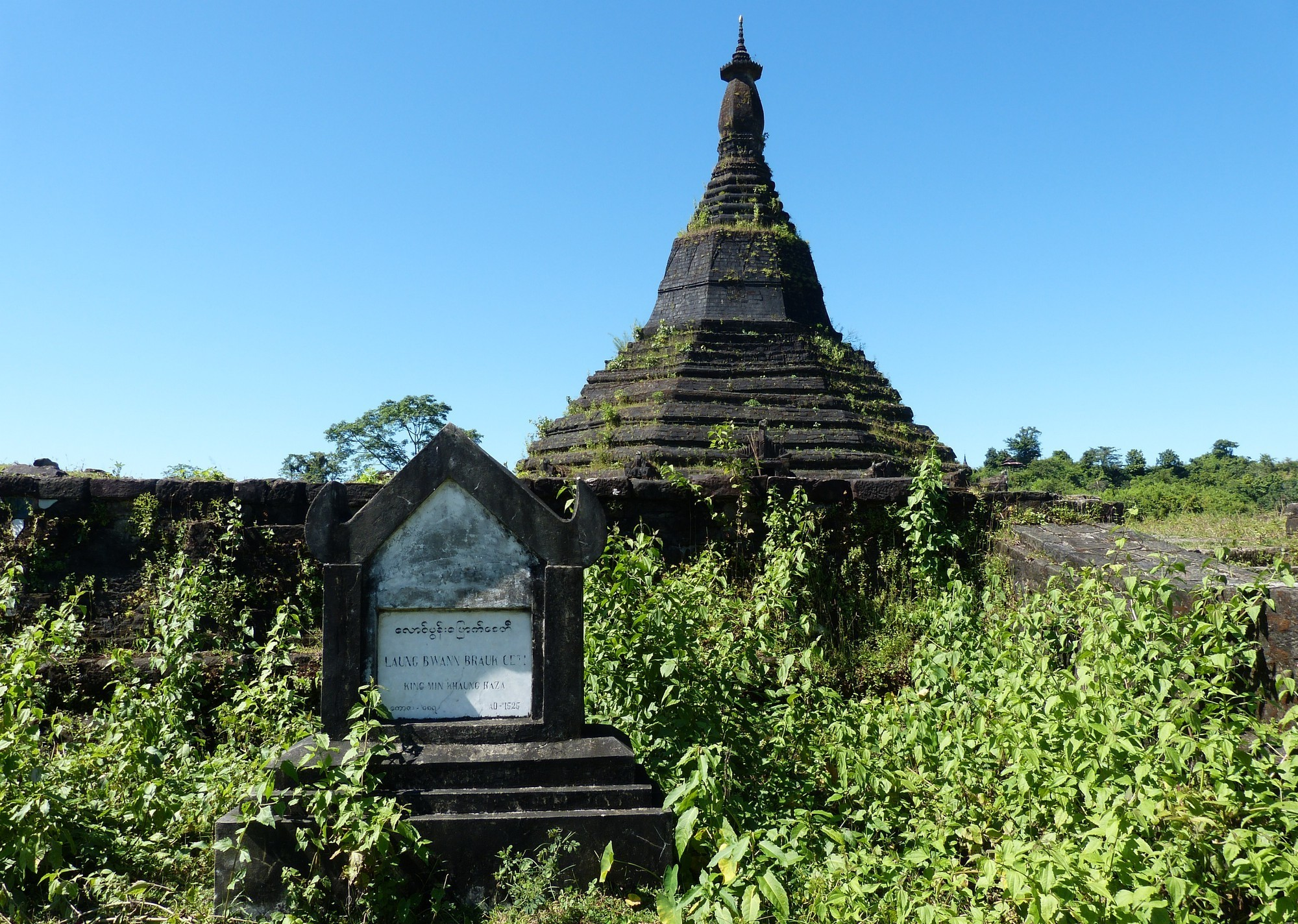
- Laung Bwann Brauk pagoda sign

- Location within Myanmar

Religion
- Affiliation: Theravada

Location
- Country: Myanmar
- Interactive map of Laung Bwann Brauk
- Coordinates: 20°36′07″N 93°11′36″E

Architecture
- Founder: Minkhaung; Thiri Thudhamma
- Completed: c. 1625

The Laung Bwann Brauk Pagoda (Burmese: လောင်ဗန်းပြောက်စေတီ; also spelled sometimes as Laung Pan Prauk) is a Buddhist stupa located in Mrauk U, Rakhine State, Myanmar. It was built in 1525 under the reign of King Min Khaung Raza and was later renovated in 1625 by King Thiri Thudhamma.

== Etymology ==
The name "Laung Bwann Brauk" translates to "coloured tile," possibly referencing the 60 glazed tile petals in red, yellow, blue, and green which of that decorates the square stone wall encircling the stupa.

== Architecture ==
The Pagoda stands on a six-foot-high stone plinth which is accessible via stone staircases. The structure rises in eight equal-height, receding octagonal tiers, followed by a taller section composed of five tapering tiers. They are crowned with symbolic Buddhist elements including a downward-facing lotus, pearl garland, upward-facing lotus, a stylized banana bud and a hti (an umbrella structure) which of all are adhering to an octagonal design.

On the first tier, each of the eight faces contains intricately carved niches that house 16 Buddha images. These are decorated with floral motifs and are considered significant examples of regional stone carving.

The cornices and flame-like pediments exhibit stylistic influences from the Pagan and later Mon periods. At the top of each pediment is a motif locally interpreted as a peacock's chest, though it may also resemble a naga (serpent) in design.

== Gallery ==
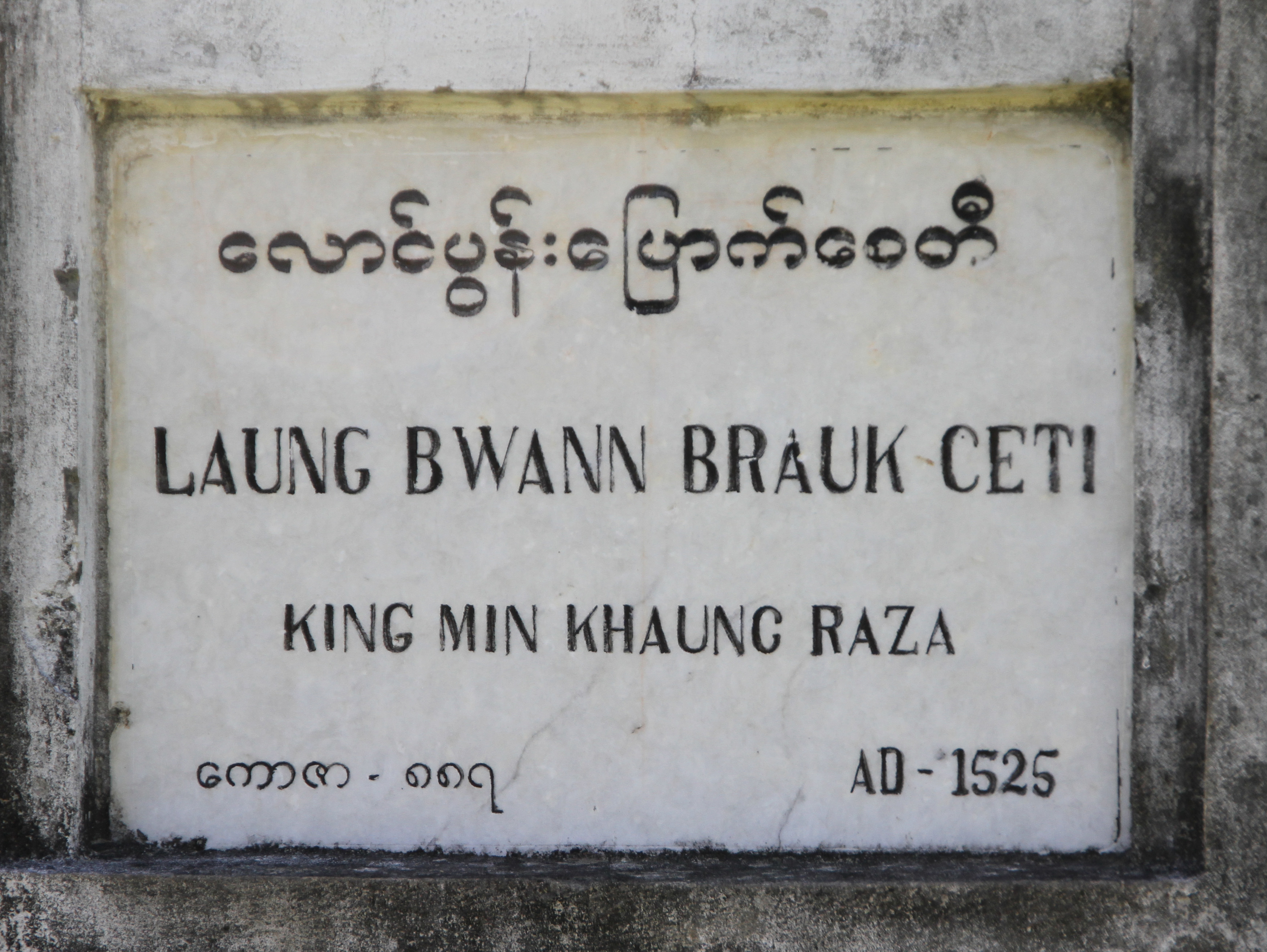

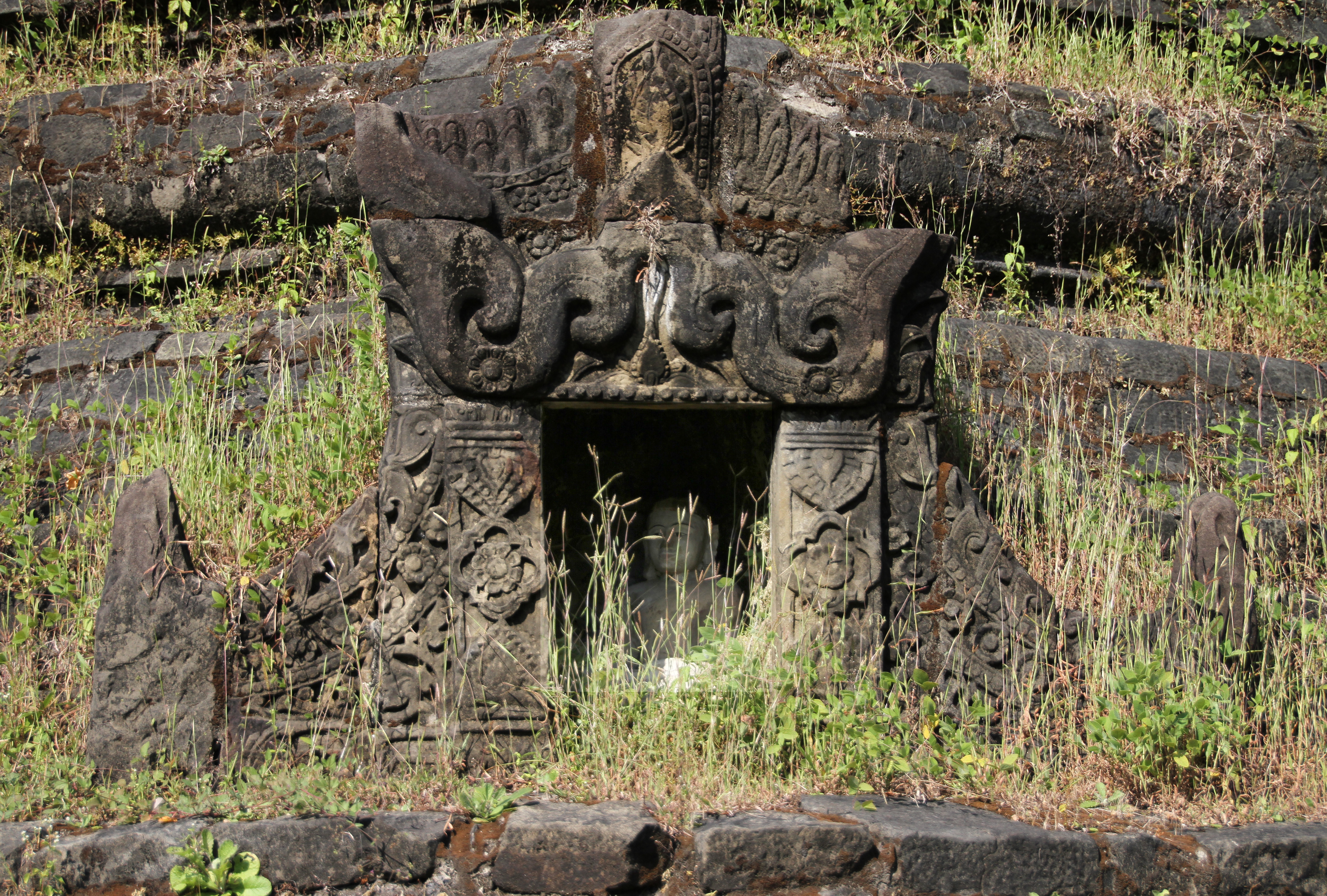

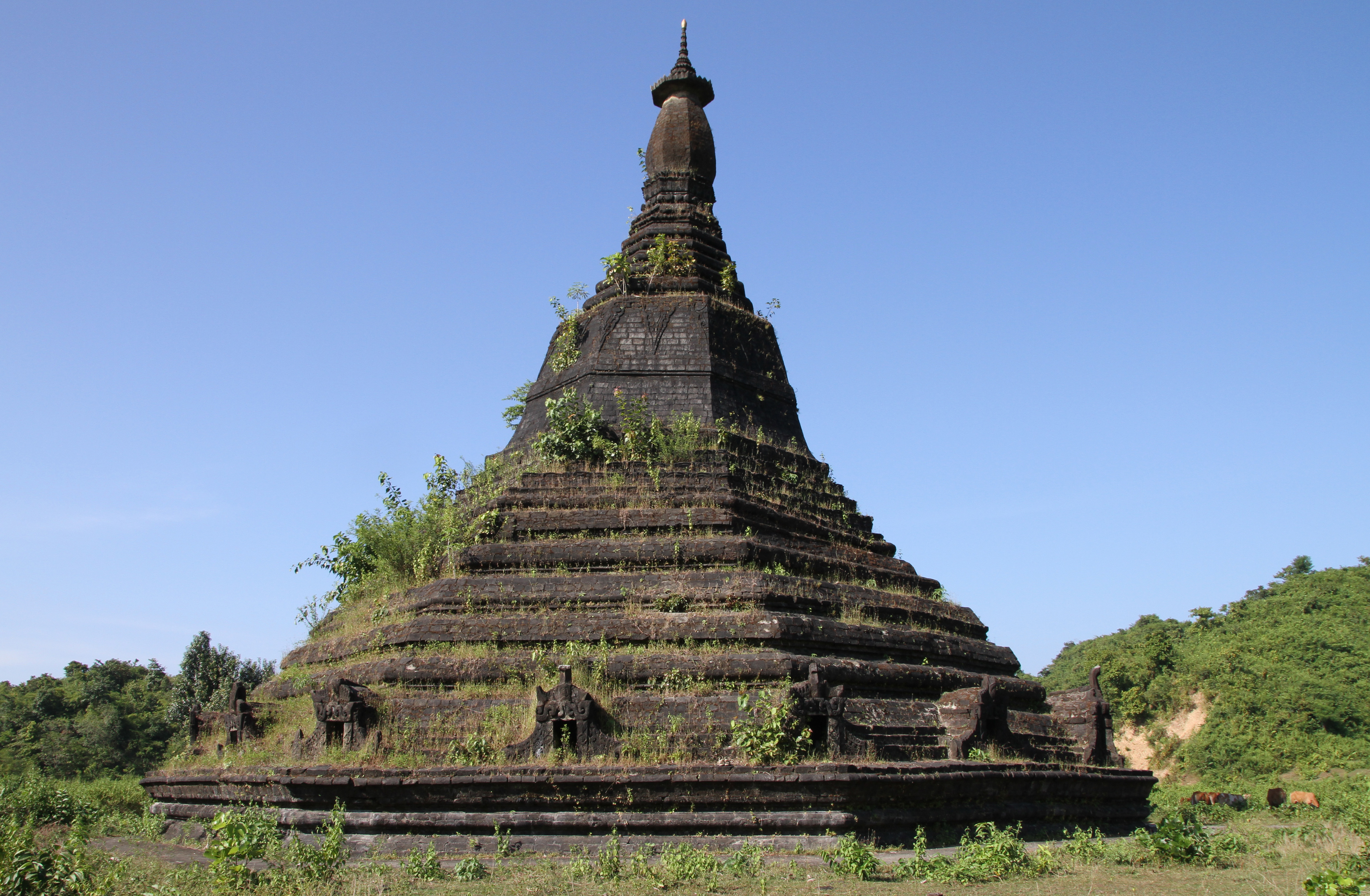

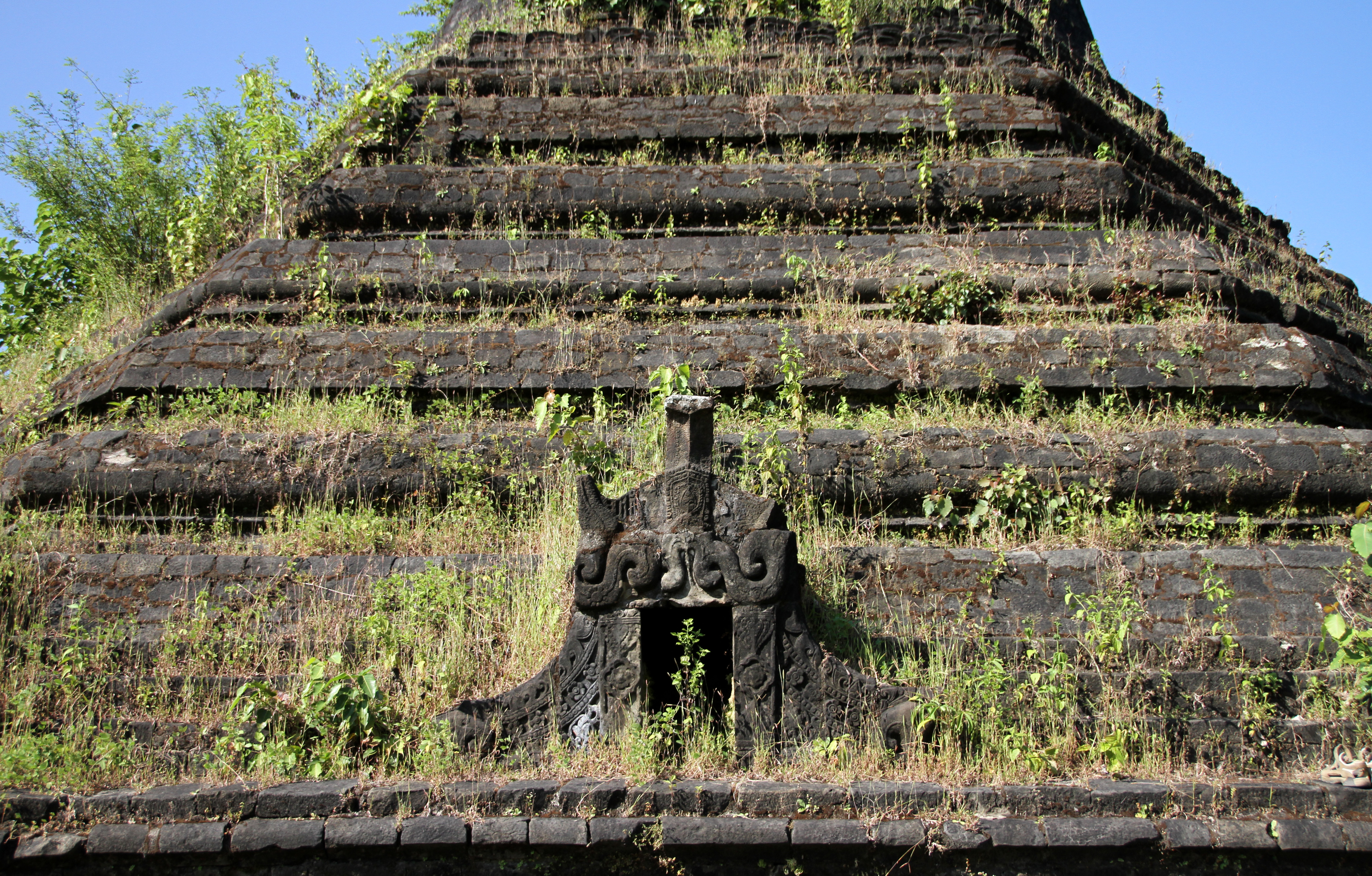

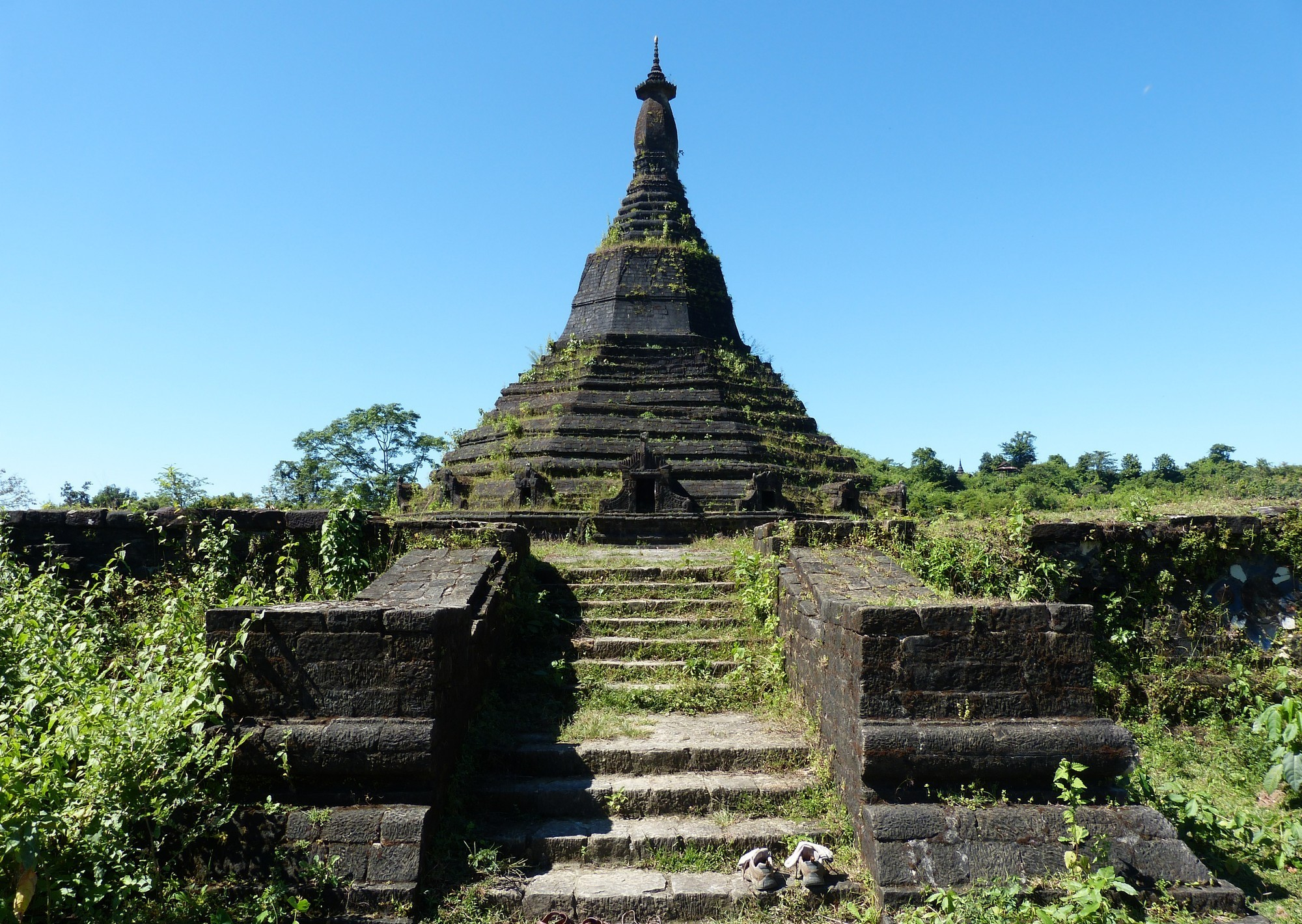

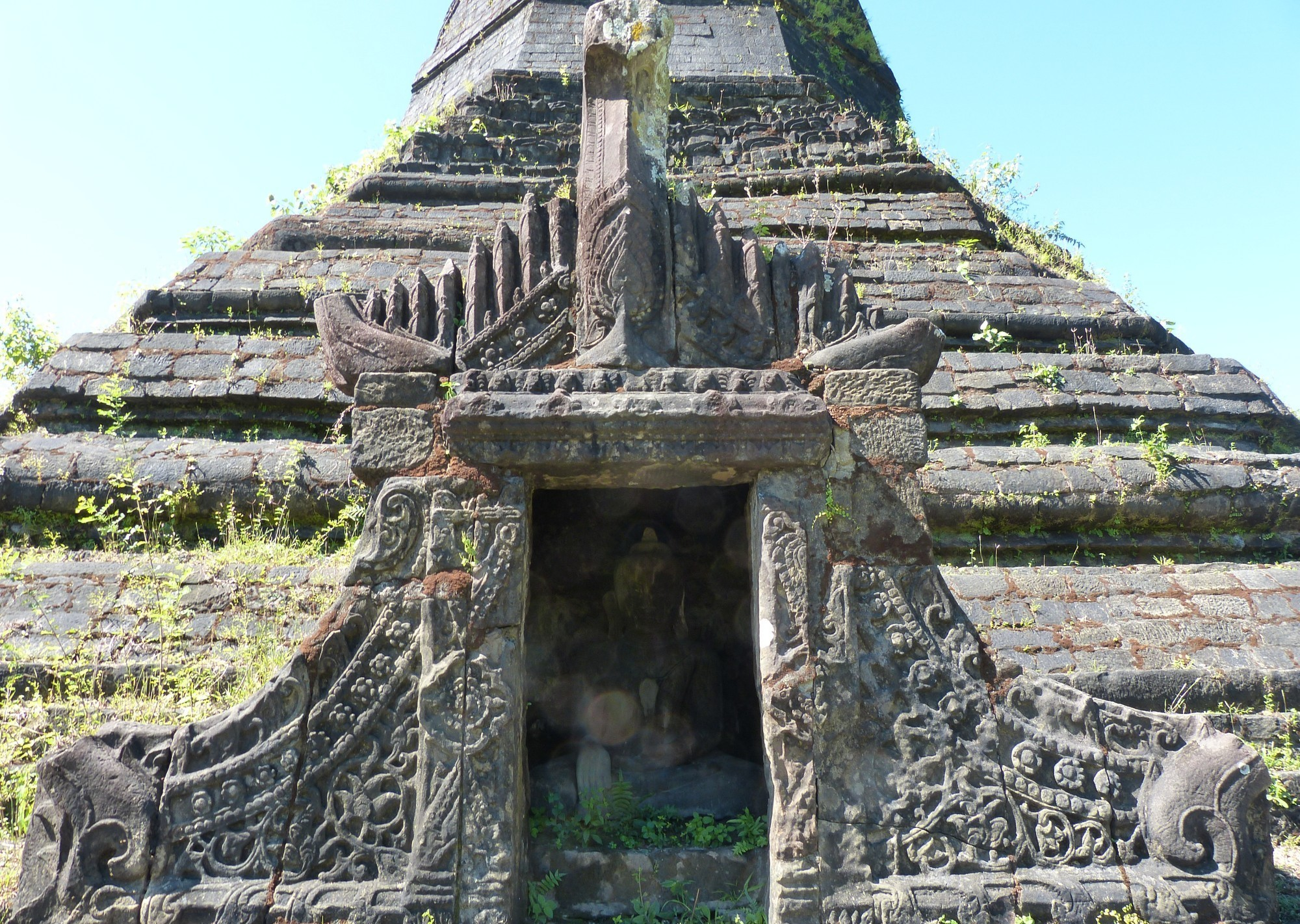

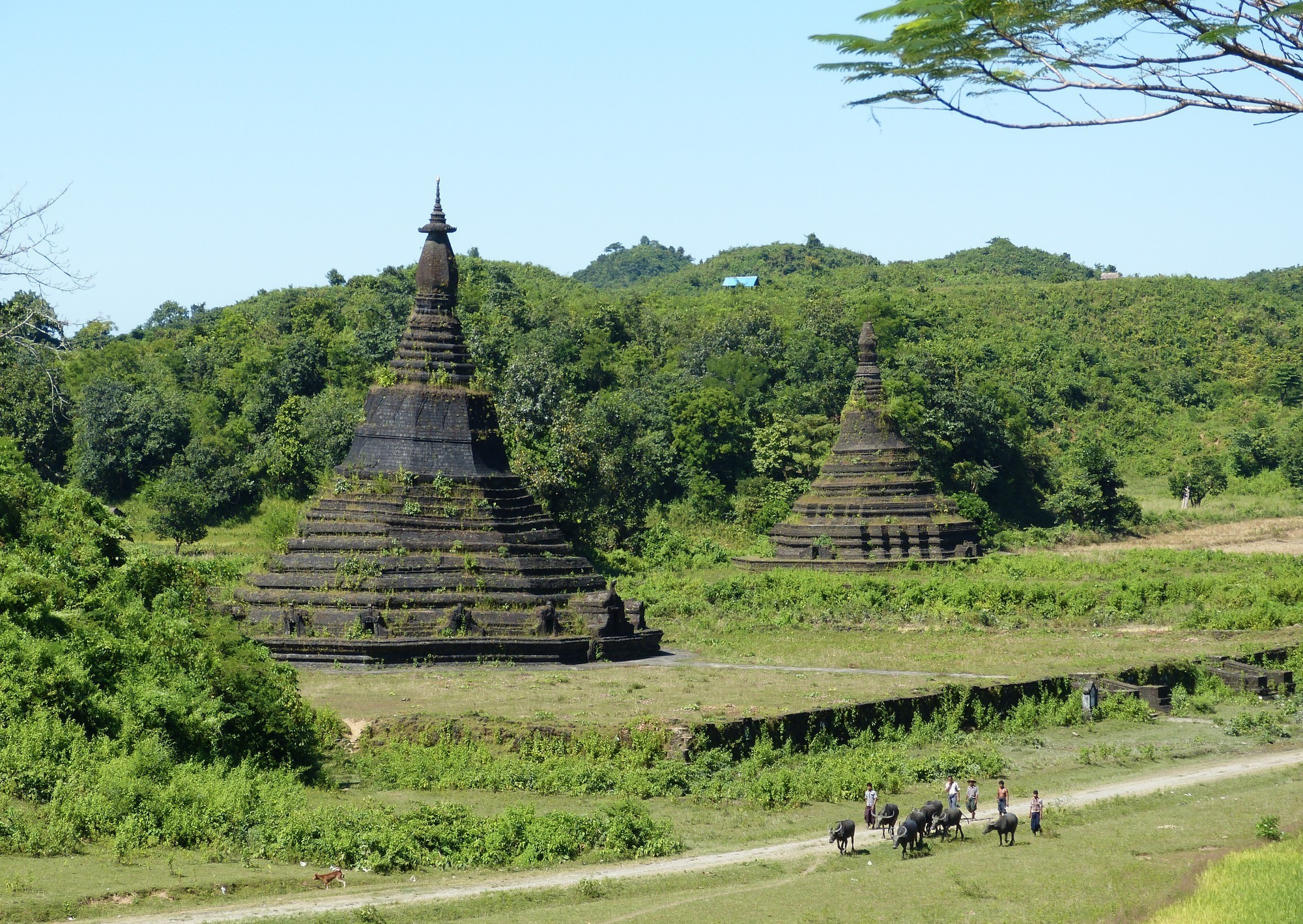

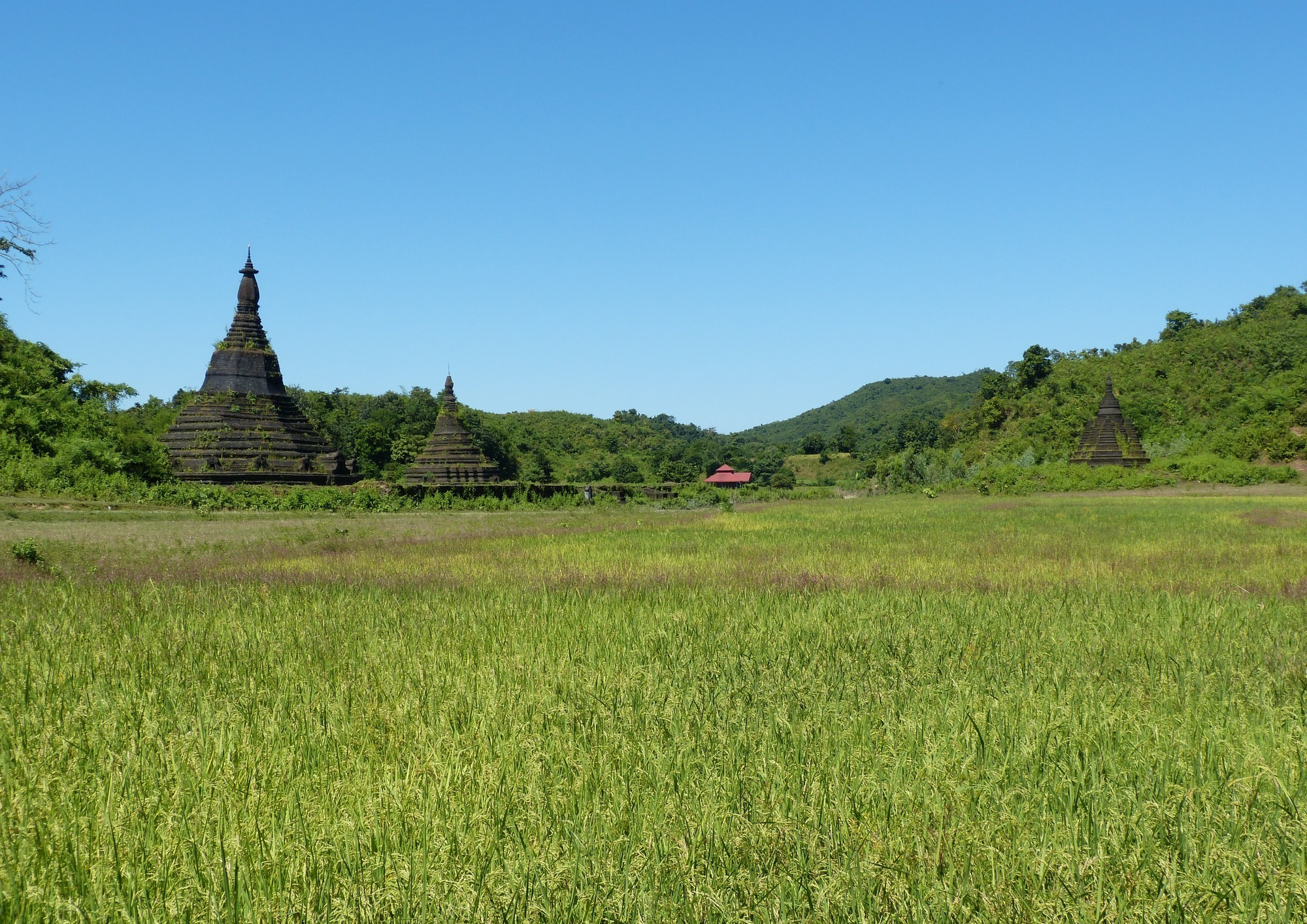

== See also ==
- List of temples in Mrauk U
- List of Buddhist temples in Myanmar
