= Ye Le Pagoda =

Buddhist Pagoda in Yangon, Myanmar

Kyaikhmawwun Yele Pagoda
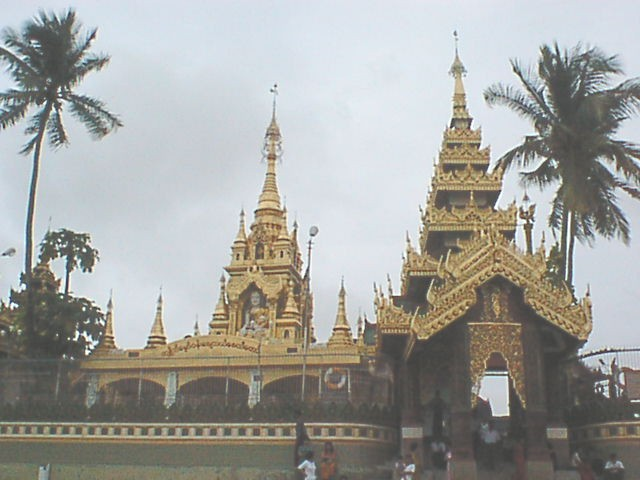

- Location within Myanmar

Religion
- Affiliation: Theravada Buddhism

Location
- Location: Kyauktan Township, Yangon Region
- Country: Myanmar
- Interactive map of Kyaikhmawwun Yele Pagoda
- Coordinates: 16.629366°N 96.324090°E

Architecture
- Founder: King Bawgasena
- Completed: Third century BCE

Kyauktan Ye Le Pagoda (Burmese: ကျောက်တန်းရေလယ်ဘုရား [tɕaʊʔtáɰ̃ jèlɛ̀ pʰəjá], formally Kyaikhmawwun Yele Pagoda (ကျိုက်မှော်ဝန်းရေလယ်စေတီတော်) is a Buddhist pagoda located in Kyauktan Township, Yangon Region, on a small island in Hmaw Wun Creek, a tributary of Yangon River. The pagoda was built with many Buddha's relics inside.

Two things are noticed, the water level never rises to cover the pagoda, and there will always be enough room for everyone who come to visit the pagoda (meaning, even the pagoda has small room for visitors somehow it is always balanced out between those who is coming & leaving).

It is approximately 20 kilometres (12 mi) south of Thanlyin. This unusual temple was built under King Bawgasena in the third century BCE. The temple hosts an impressive collection of paintings, sculptures and other fine demonstrations of Burmese Buddhist artwork and craftsmanship.

== Gallery ==
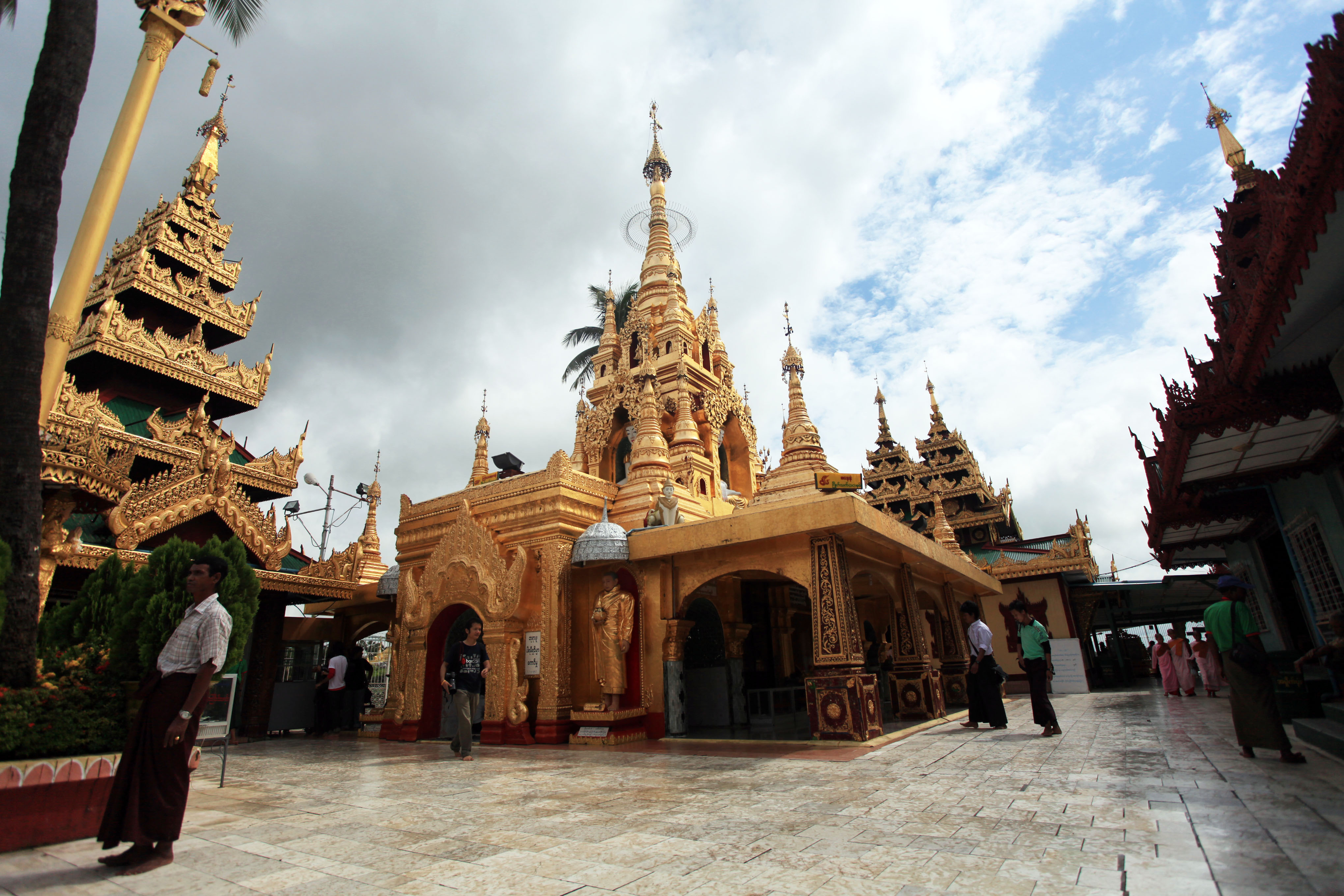
Pagoda

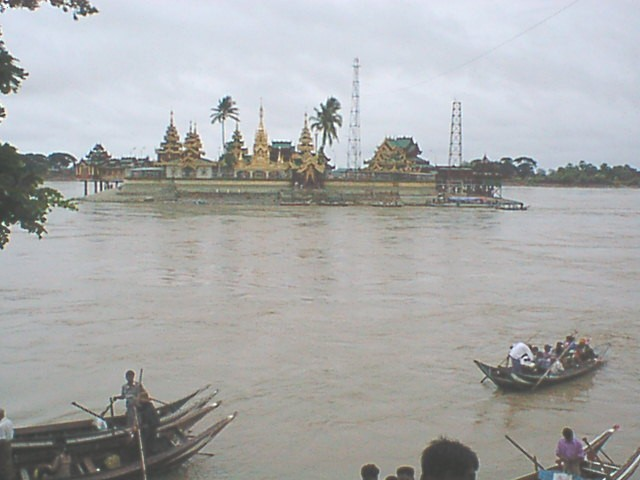
Kyauktan Ye Le (Entire Island View)

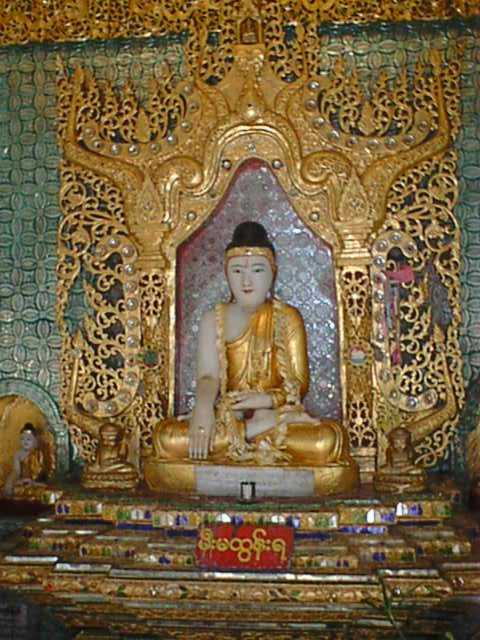
Statue of Buddha Inside Kyauktan Ye Le

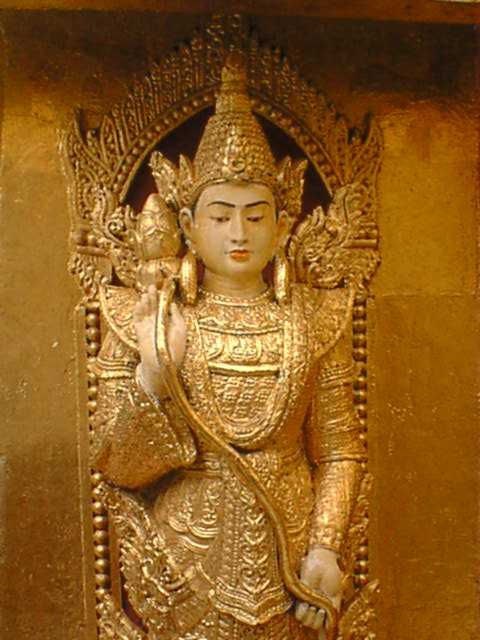
Thagyamin

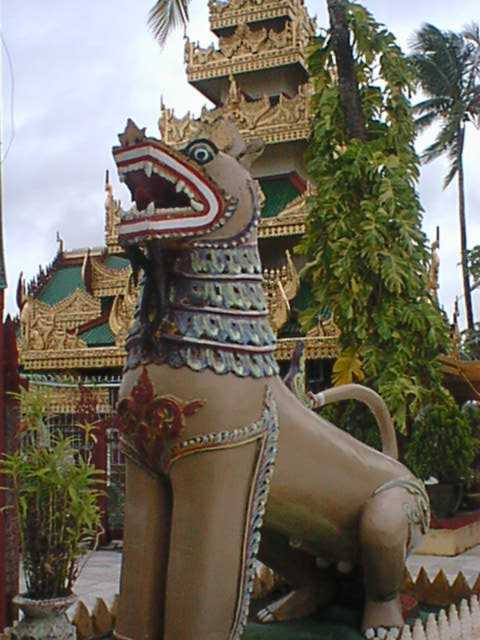
Statue Guarding Kyauktan Ye Le

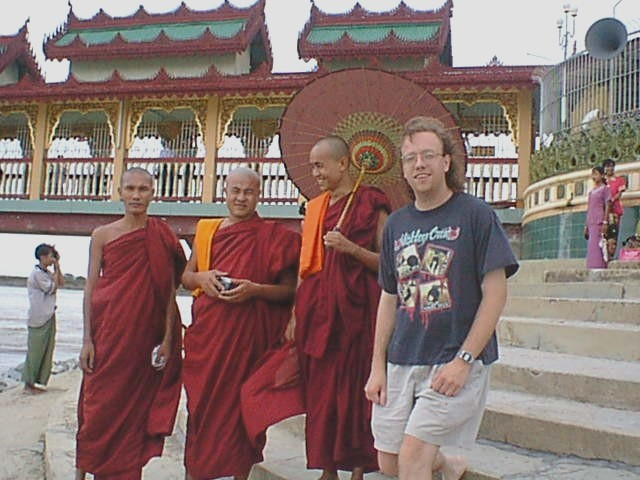
Kyauktan Ye Le Monks With Tourist

== See also ==
- Kyaik Ne Ye Lay Pagoda- another pagoda in ocean
