= Maha Thetkya Yanthi Buddha =

Buddhist temple in Myanmar

Maha Thetkya Yanthi Buddha Mahāsakyaraṃsi
- မဟာသကျရံသီ ရုပ်ရှင်တော်မြတ်ကြီး

Religion
- Affiliation: Theravada Buddhism

Location
- Country: Ottarathiri Township, Naypyidaw, Myanmar
- Interactive map of Maha Thetkya Yanthi Buddha; Mahāsakyaraṃsi
- Coordinates: 19.868934°N 96.140135°E

Architecture
- Founder: Naypyidaw Development Committee
- Completed: 2015; 11 years ago

Maha Thetkya Yanthi Buddha (Burmese: မဟာသကျရံသီ ရုပ်ရှင်တော်မြတ်ကြီး); Pali: Mahāsakyaraṃsi) is a Buddhist temple in Ottarathiri Township, Naypyidaw Union Territory, Myanmar that houses a 32-foot (9.8 m) marble image of the standing Buddha that weighs 700 tonnes (690 long tons; 770 short tons). The marble was sourced from a quarry 375 miles (604 km) north in Mandalay. The image was enshrined on 20 June 2015 in the Gandhakuṭi Pavilion (ဂန္ဓကုဋိကျောင်းဆောင်). Construction efforts were undertaken by ACE Construction Group, owned by Tint Hsan.

== See also ==
- Buddhism in Myanmar
