= Zina Man Aung Pagoda =

Buddhist temple in Mrauk U, Myanmar

Zina Man Aung Pagoda ဇိနမာရ်အောင်စေတီ
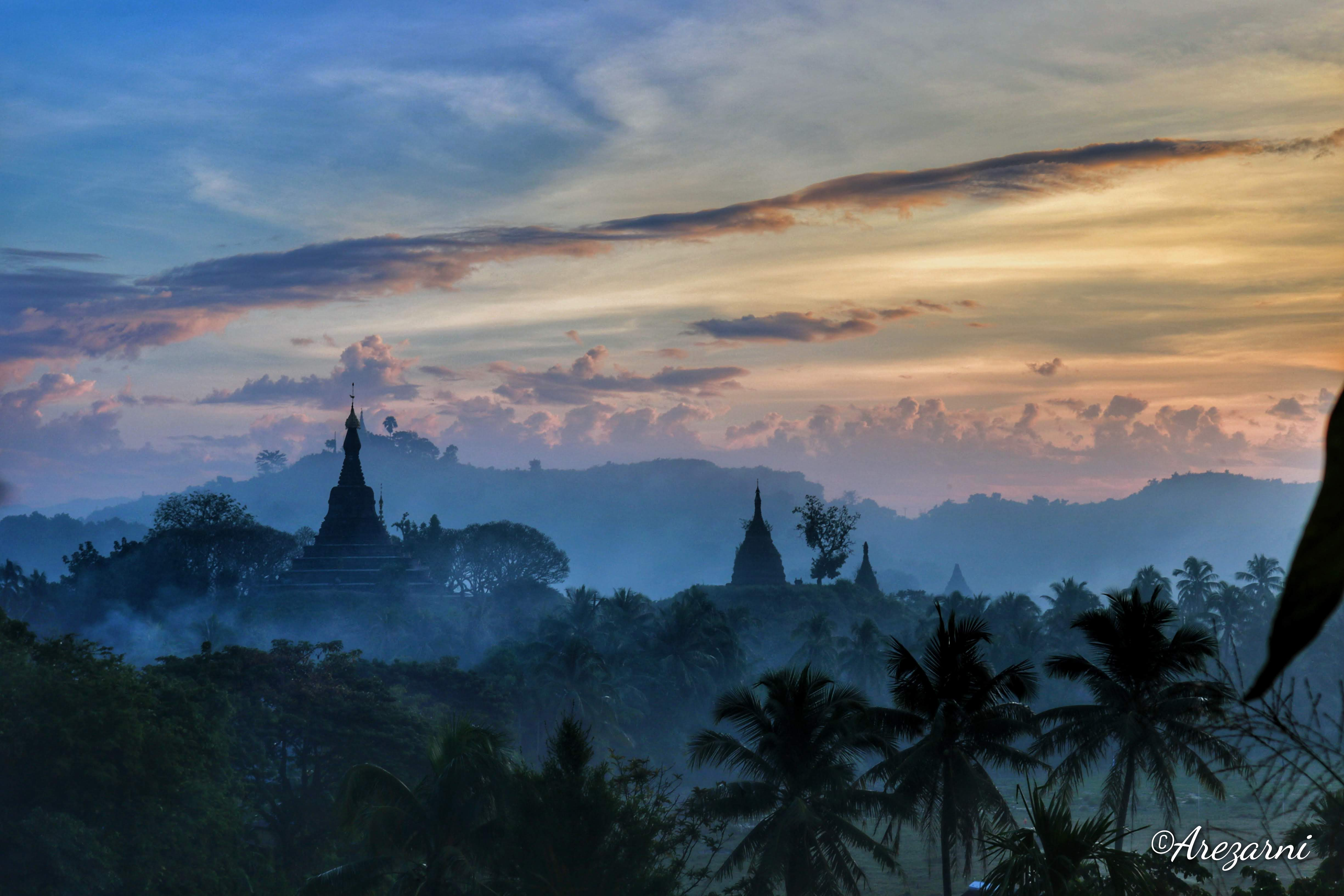
- View of the Temple and Panthi Taung Pagodas

- Location within Myanmar

Religion
- Affiliation: Theravada

Location
- Country: Myanmar
- Interactive map of Zina Man Aung Pagoda ဇိနမာရ်အောင်စေတီ
- Coordinates: 20°35′08″N 93°11′43″E

Architecture
- Founder: Sanda Thudhamma of Mrauk-U
- Completed: c. 1652

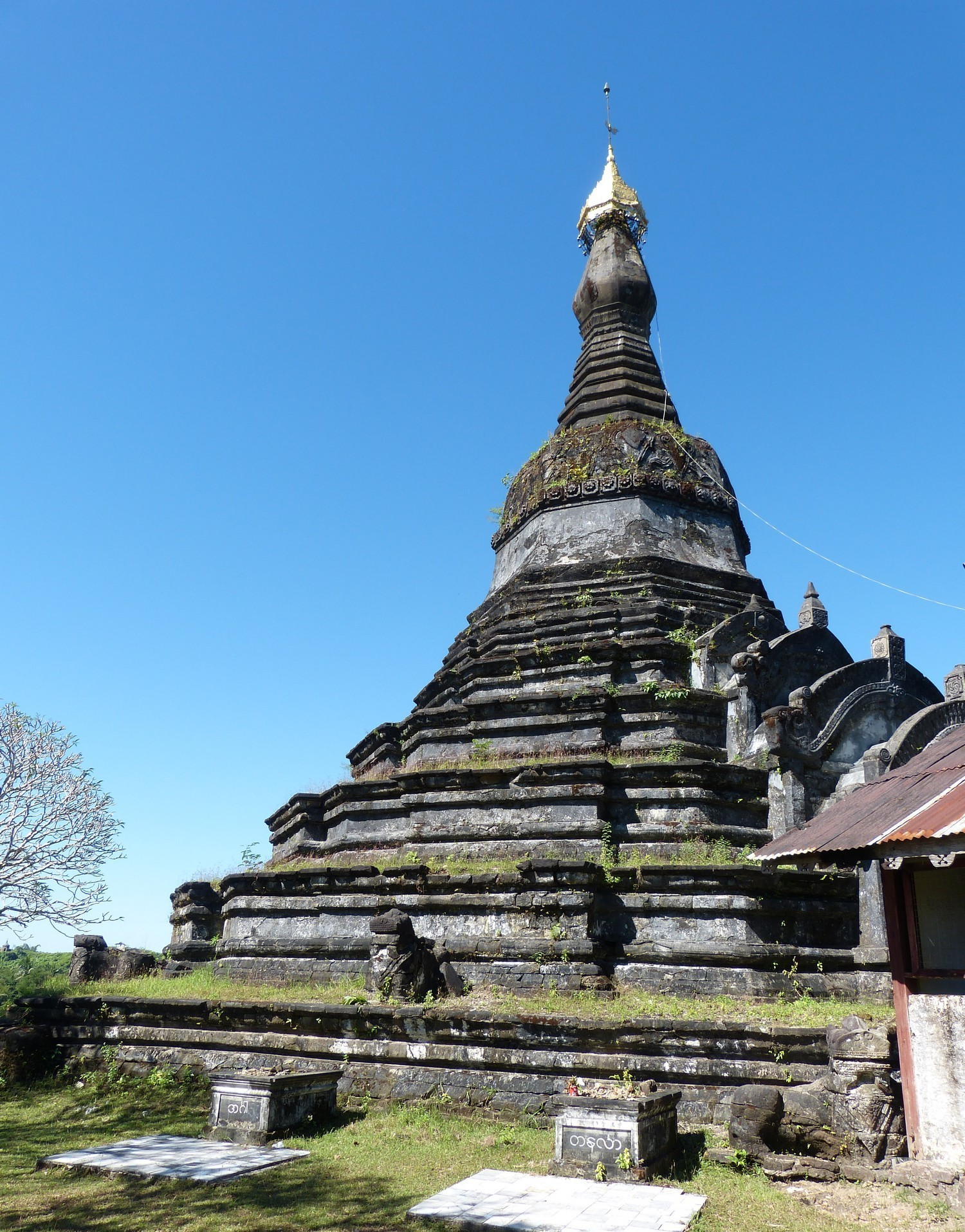
View of the temple

Zina Man-Aung Pagoda (Burmese: ဇိနမာရ်အောင်စေတီ) is a Buddhist temple located in the southern part of Mrauk-U, Rakhine State, Myanmar. It stands as one of three major stupas built by King Sanda Thudhamma Raza, who ruled from 1652 to 1684.

== Etymology ==
The name "Zina Man-aung" symbolizes the Buddha's triumph over Mara, the king of death as with "Zina" derived from the Pali word jina (victor), and "Man-aung" indicating conquest over Mara.

== Architecture ==
The pagoda features an octagonal base, a hallmark of many Mrauk-U religious structures. Constructed systematically with large stone blocks, the stupa is designed in eight ascending tiers, giving it a solid and symmetrical appearance. The base measures approximately 320 feet in circumference, with a total height of 120 feet.

Access to the temple is provided by brick staircases on both the eastern and western sides. On the eastern side, a long, narrow corridor leads to a stone porch, the facade of which is adorned with finely crafted bas-relief carvings. Above the eastern entrance lies a vaulted passage with five layered arches, demonstrating refined stonework.

The pagoda features modest carvings, including manuthiha figures with lion bodies and human heads at each corner. Some simple stone reliefs decorate the eastern porch, and later additions like pipal leaf and rosette patterns can be seen around the bell.

== Location ==
It is situated on Pantein Hill, about half a mile south of the Royal Palace Hill in Mrauk-U and approximately 300 cubits east of the now-vanished Takkasila Pagoda.

== Gallery ==
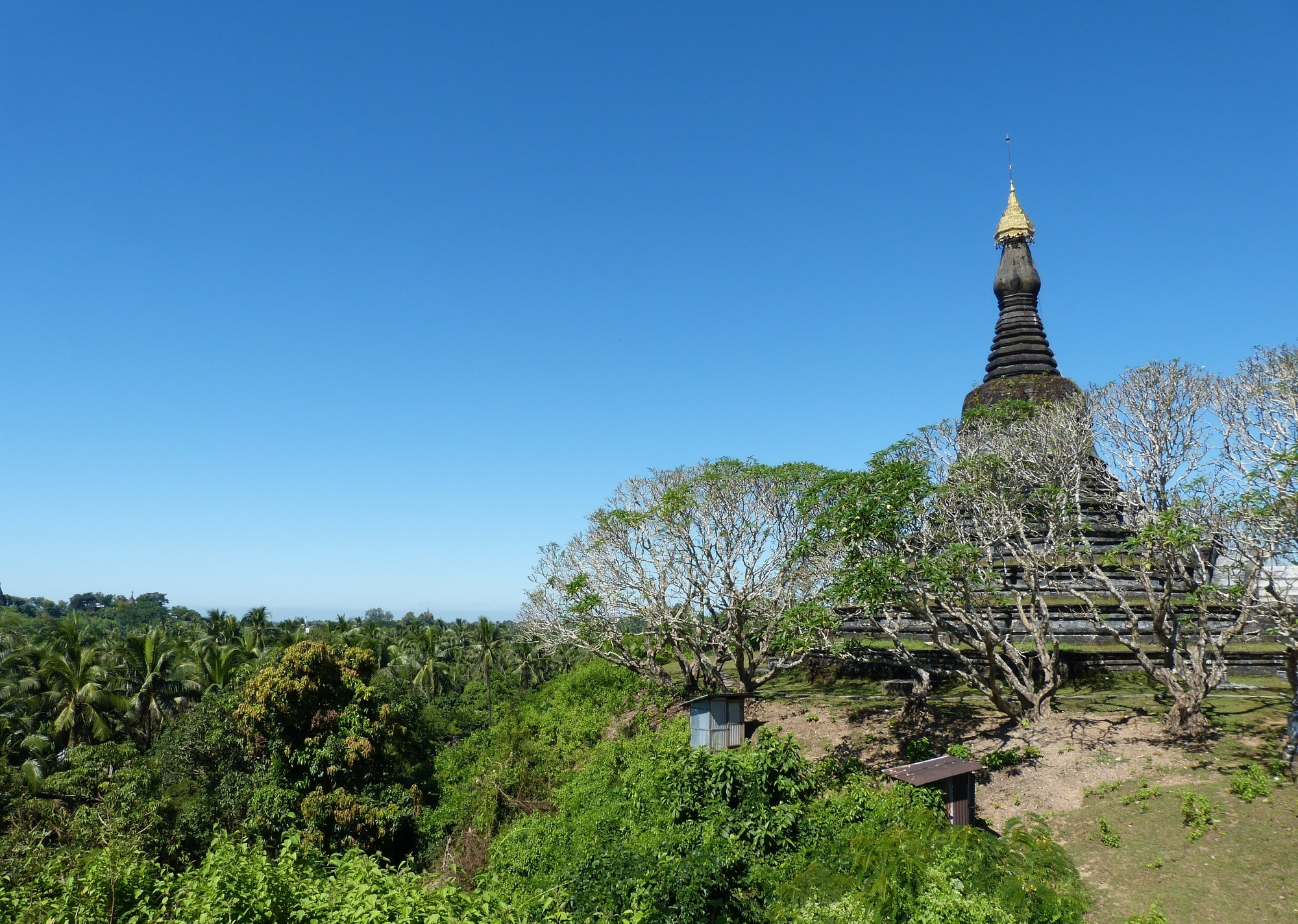
View of Pagoda

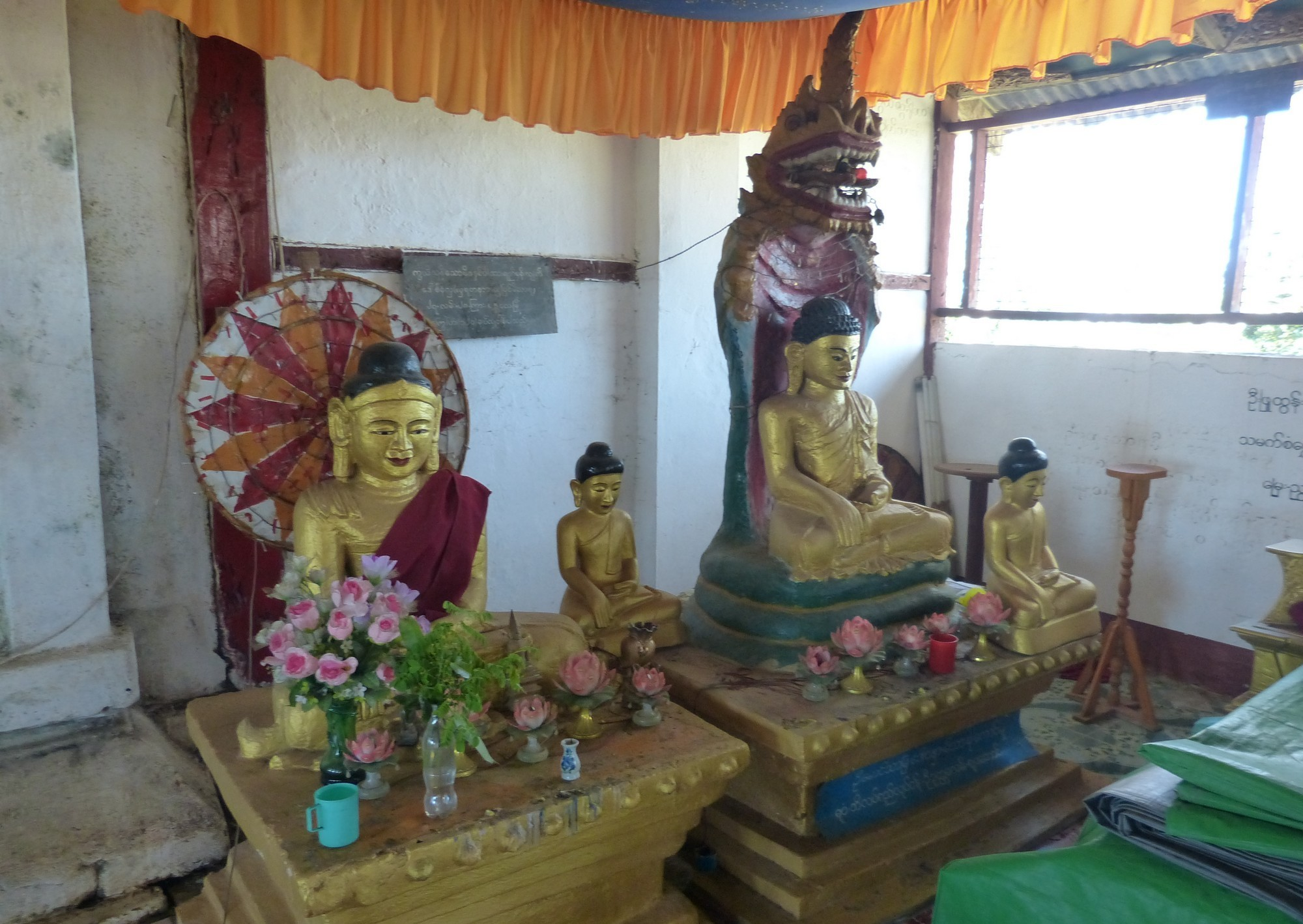
Statue of Buddhas inside the temple

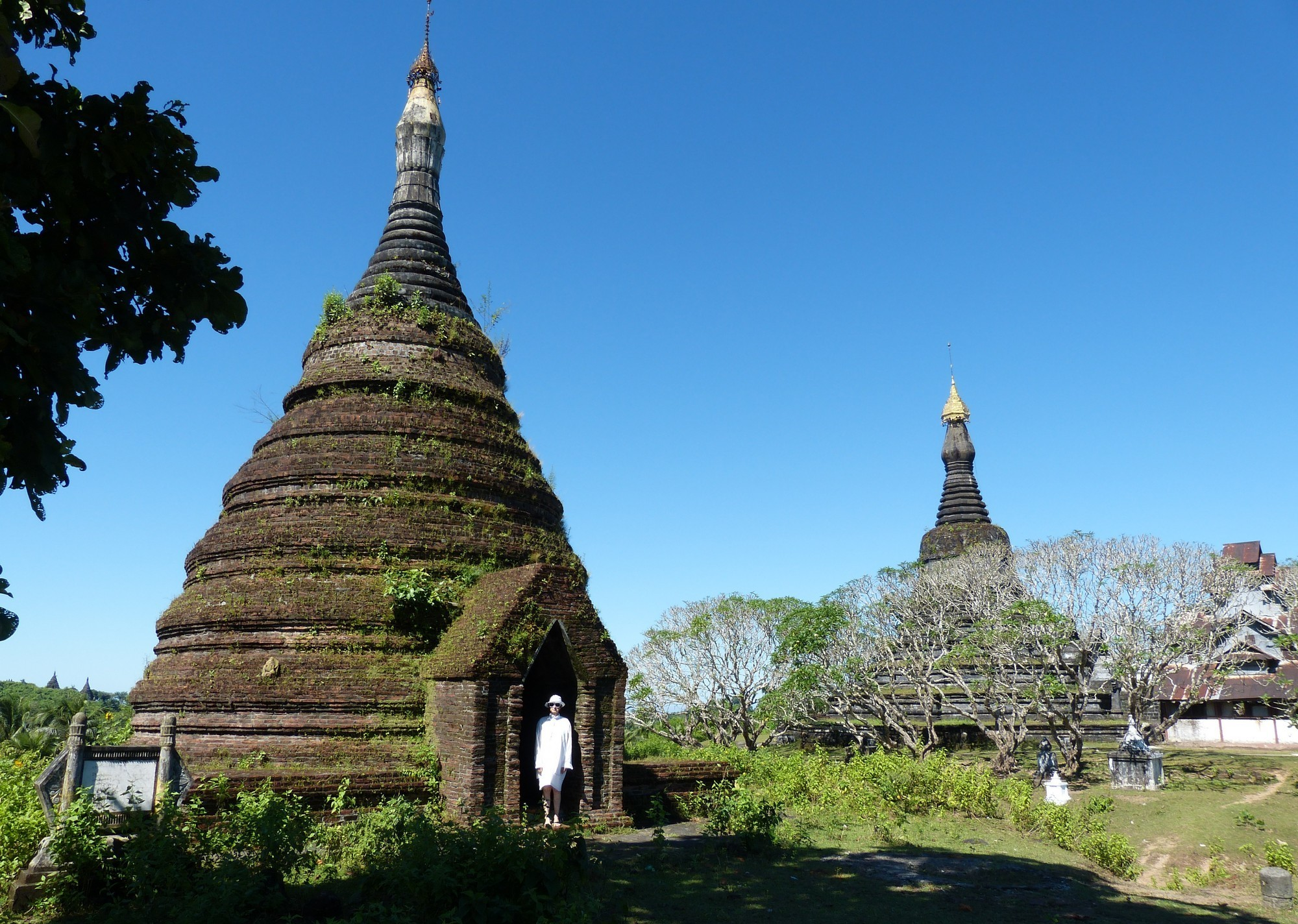
Near view of the pagoda

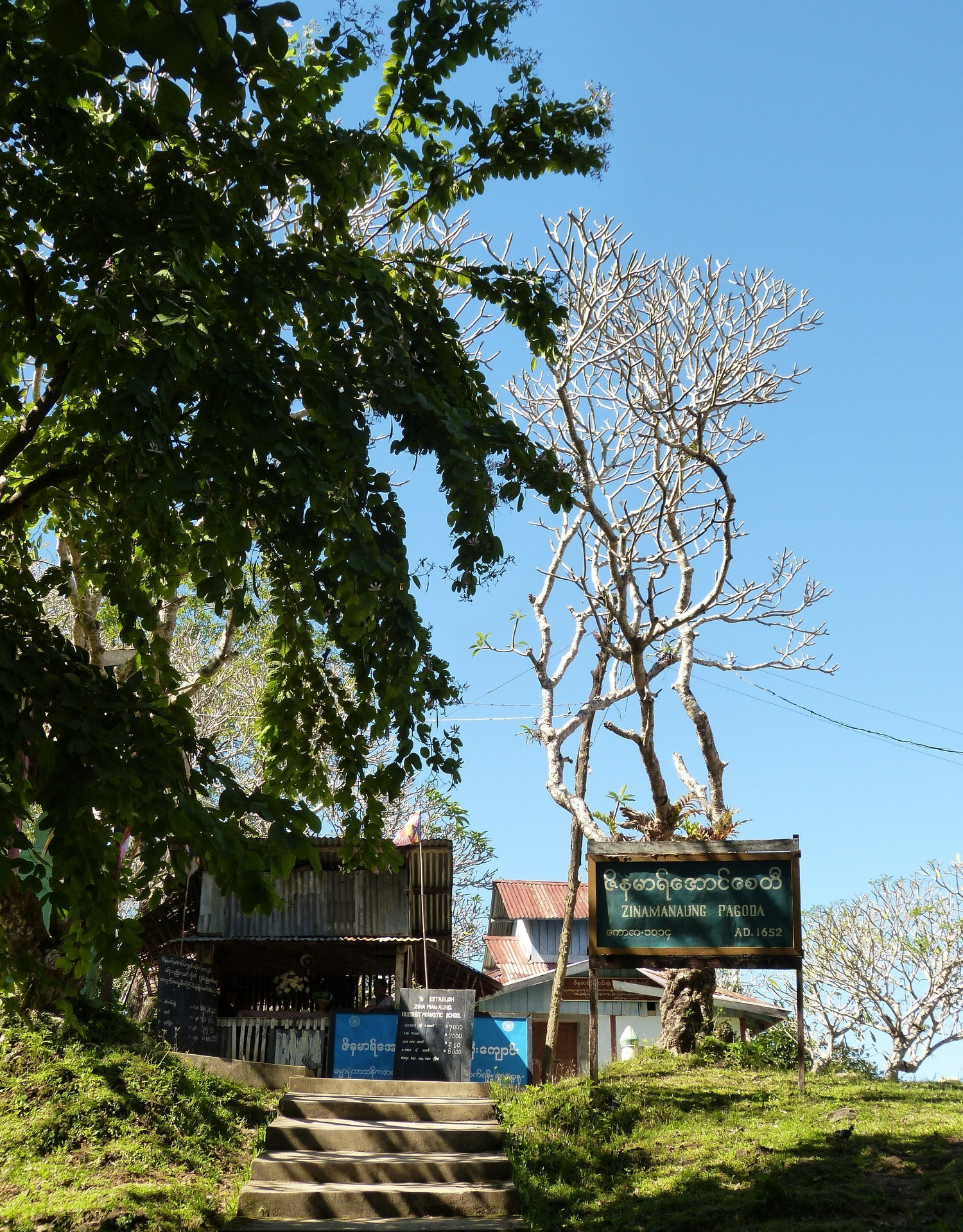
Entrance to the Pagoda

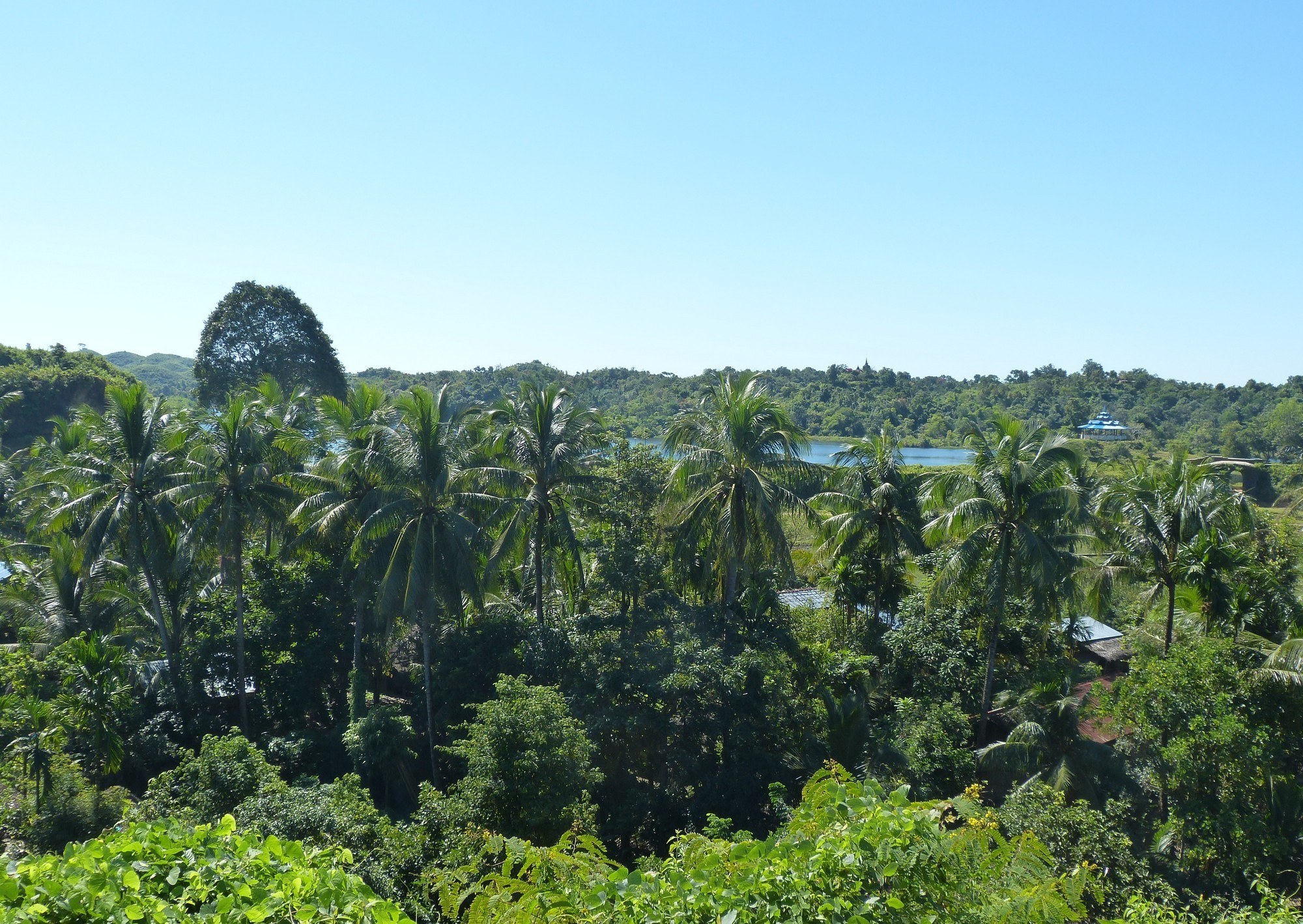
View from the Lattsaykan Lake

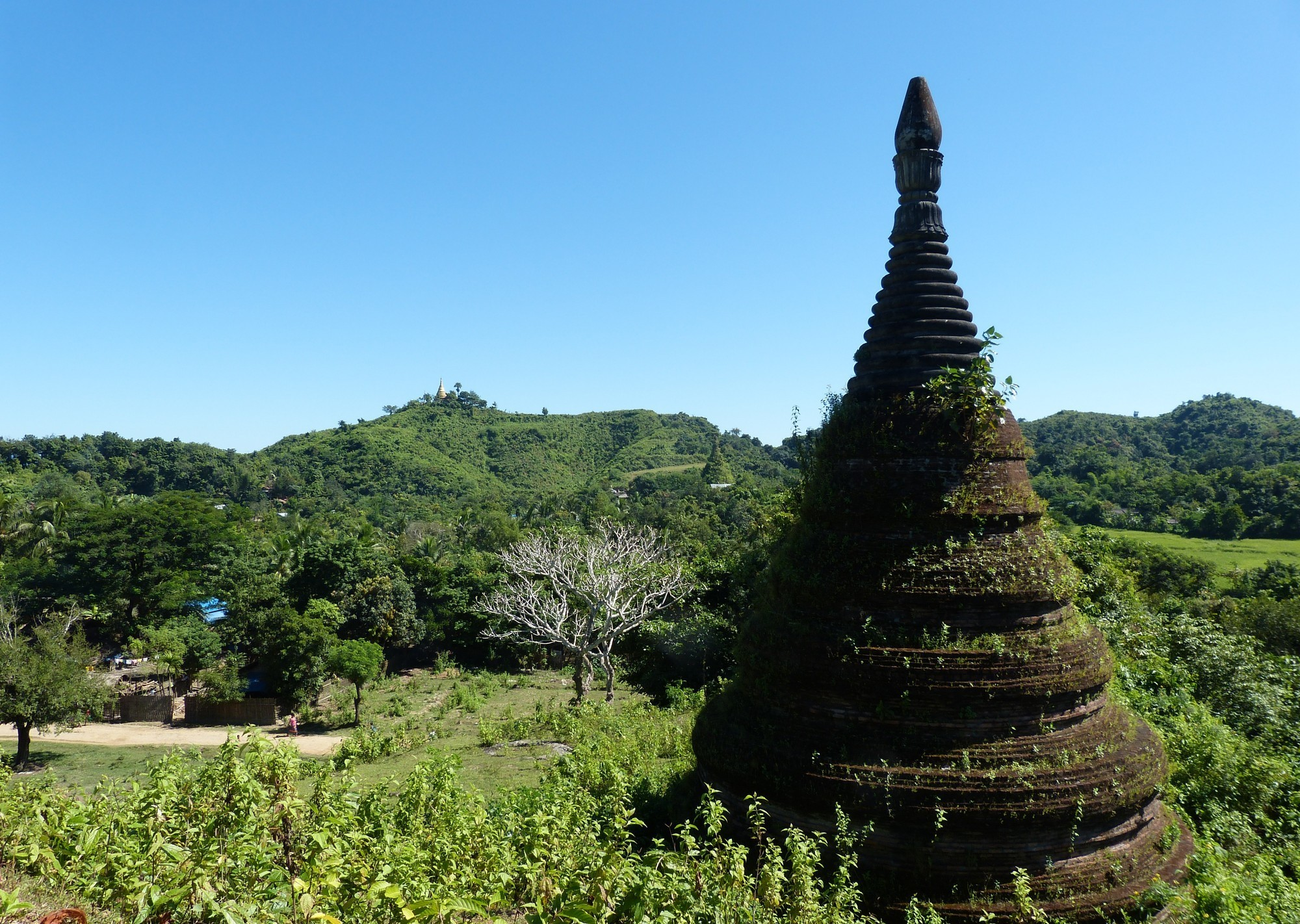
Pagoda View

== See also ==
- List of Temples in Mrauk U
- List of Buddhist temples in Myanmar
