= Setkyathiha Pagoda =

Buddhist Pagoda in Mandalay, Myanmar

- စကြာသီဟစေတီ
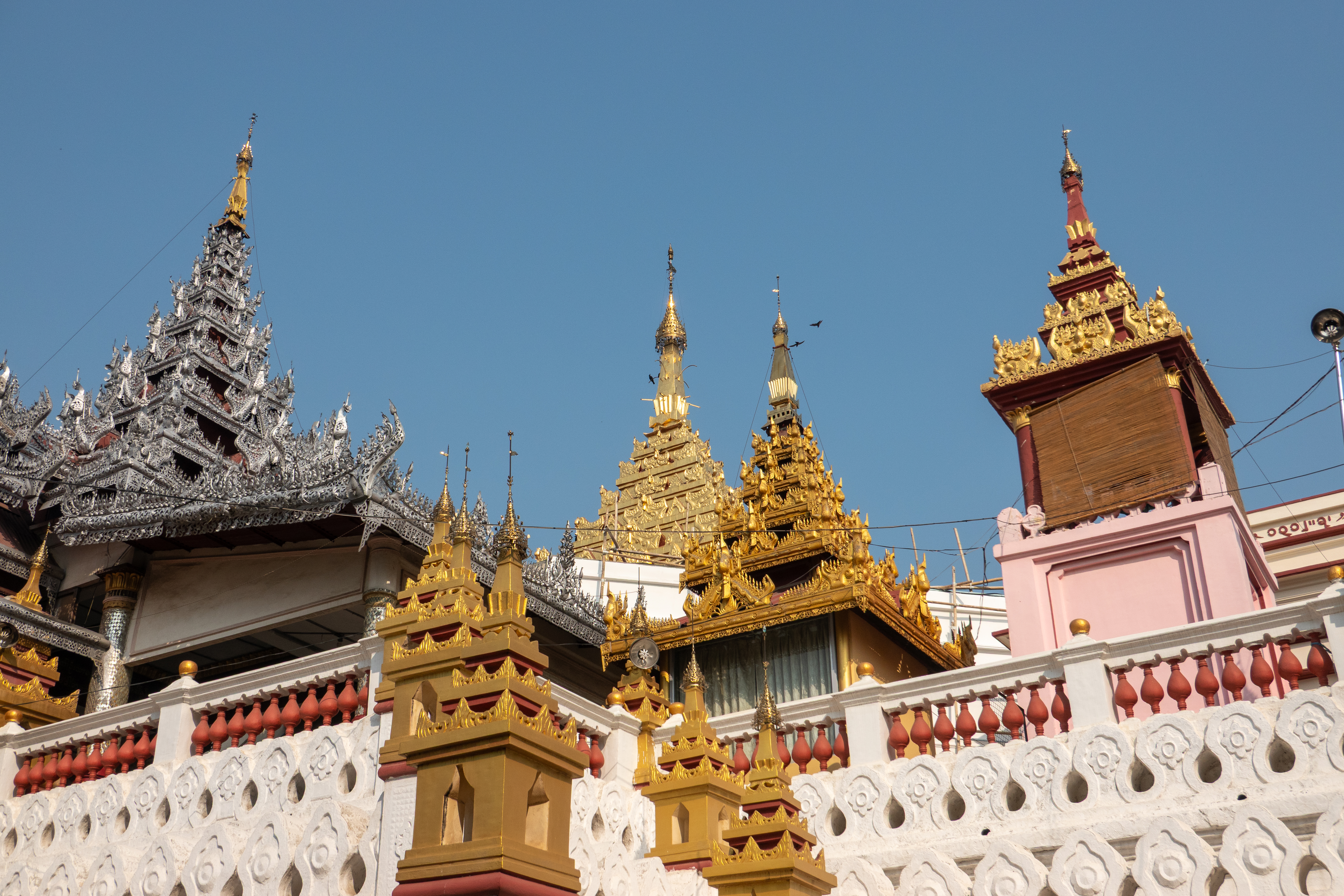

Religion
- Affiliation: Theravada Buddhism

Location
- Country: Mandalay, Mandalay Region, Burma
- Interactive map of Setkyathiha Pagoda
- Coordinates: 21.9768°N 96.0750°E

Architecture
- Completed: 1884; 142 years ago

Setkyathiha Pagoda (Burmese: စကြာသီဟစေတီ) is a notable pagoda in Mandalay, Myanmar. It is known for a large bronze image of the Buddha cast by King Bagyidaw in Inwa just before the beginning of the First Anglo-Burmese War in 1824. The image was moved to Amarapura in 1852 when the Second Anglo-Burmese War broke out, and to Mandalay in 1885 when the Third Anglo-Burmese War started. The pagoda was built in 1884, located south of Zegyo Market on the eastern bank of the Shwetachaung Canal.
