= Kyaik Ne Yay Lae Pagoda =

Buddhist Pagoda in Mon, Myanmar

- Location within Myanmar

Location
- Location: Thanbyuzayat Township, Mon State
- Coordinates: 15.9496224°N 97.6049397°E

Kyaik Ne Yay Lae Pagoda (Burmese: ဆံတော်ရှင်ကျိုက်နဲ ရေလယ်ဘုရား) is a Buddhist pagoda located in the ocean just off the coast within the geographic boundaries of Wekalaung village of Thanbyuzayat township in Mon state of Myanmar.

== Scope ==
The pagoda can be reached on foot via 1.6 miles (2.6 km) long ridge when the tide is low. When tide becomes high, the pagoda is disconnected from the local village. The pagoda is visited by Buddhist pilgrims mainly on the second full of Tan Saung Mon. It is believed that the blessings of The Buddha helps to reduce the flow and open the way for the pilgrims to the pagoda. The pagoda was built by King Thirimathaka (Ashoka in Burmese language).

== Incidents ==
- In 2021, due to sudden rise in the tide, 15 were dead and several pilgrims were injured as they were washed by water on the way to the pagoda.
