= Maha Min Htin Monastery =

Buddhist monastery in Mandalay, Myanmar

- မဟာမင်းထင်ကျောင်း
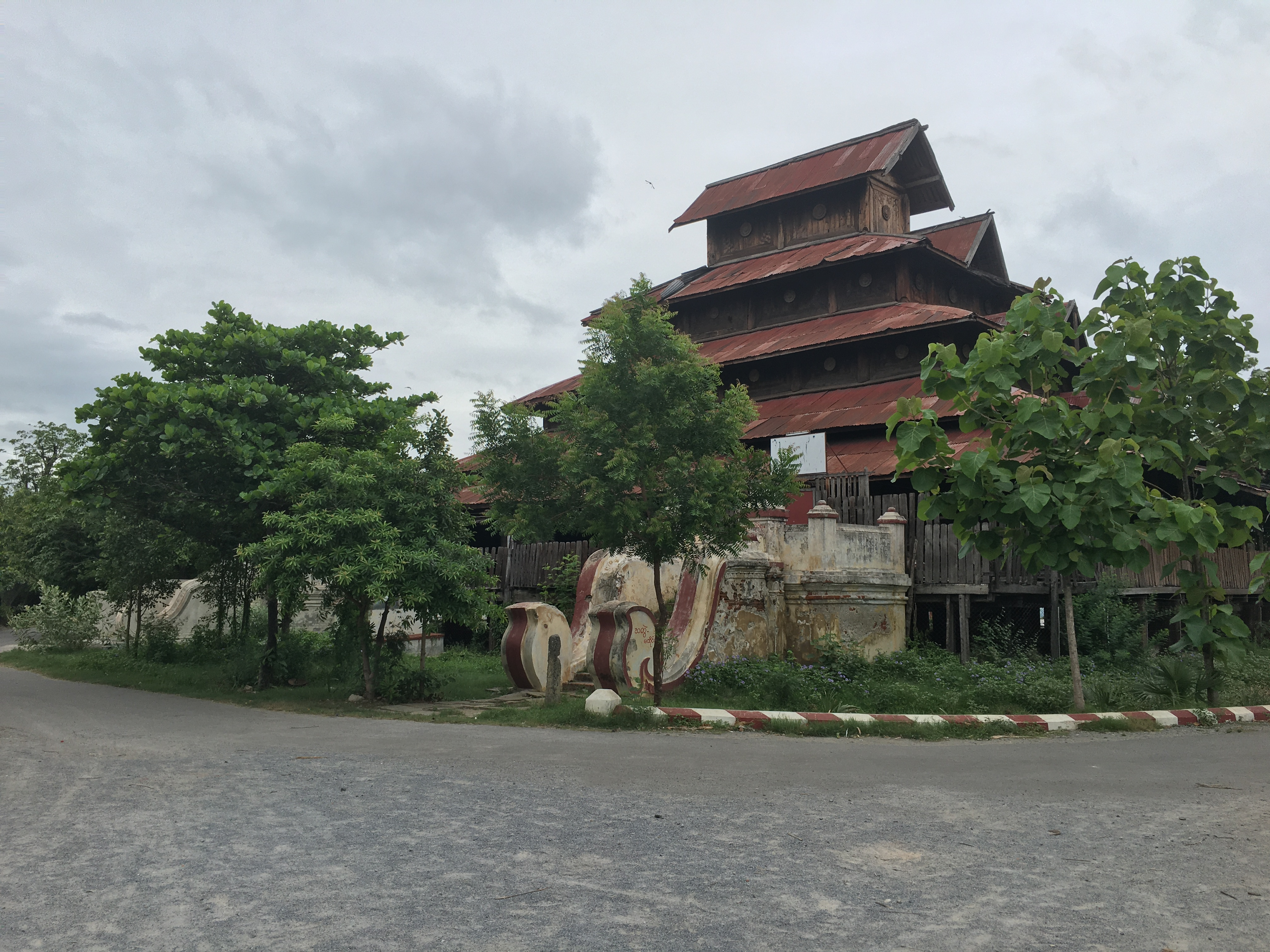

- Location within Myanmar

Religion
- Affiliation: Theravada Buddhism

Location
- Country: Mandalay, Mandalay Region, Burma
- Interactive map of Maha Min Htin Monastery
- Coordinates: 21.953979°N 96.084614°E

Architecture
- Founder: Pyay Prince
- Completed: 1852; 174 years ago

Maha Min Htin Monastery (Burmese: မဟာမင်းထင်ကျောင်း) is a historic Buddhist monastery in Mandalay, Burma. The monastery was established in 1852, donated by Maha Minhla Minkyaw U Min Htin and is located near the Mahamuni Buddha Temple. It was originally built in Inwa and was moved to Mandalay in 1876. Of the 426 teak columns used in the original monastery at Inwa, 143 remain. The monastery is surrounded by 3 small moats.

== See also ==
- Kyaung
