= Htilin Monastery =

Buddhist monastery in Mandalay, Myanmar

Htilin Monastery (Burmese: ထီးလင်းဘုန်းကြီးကျောင်း) is a Buddhist monastery in Mandalay, Burma. It is located in Western Thiri Khema Ward in Chanayethazan Township. The monastery is divided into several hermitages by geographical location such as West Htilin Monastery, South Htilin Monastery etc. During the 8888 Uprising several Htilin monks were killed. Earlier in 1988, in February, the monastery was responsible for founding a new ritual at Mahamuni Buddha Temple involving face washing the sacred Buddha statue.
