= Sanda Thuriya of Dhanyawadi =

Sanda Thuriya စန္ဒာသူရိယမင်းကြီး

King of Dhanyawaddy
- Reign: 146 - 198 CE
- Predecessor: Thiri Raza
- Successor: Thuriya Dipati
- Born: Dhanyawadi
- Died: Dhanyawadi
- Consort: Sanda Devi
- Issue: Thuriya Dipati
- House: Kanyazagyi
- Religion: Buddhism (converted)

Sanda Thuriya (Burmese:စန္ဒာသူရိယ ; Pali:candāsuriya), was a legendary king of Dhanyawadi and founder of Third Dhanyawadi kingdom. In Arakanese tradition, he is famous for casting of great Mahamuni Buddha in the year 150 AD.

== Early life ==
King Sandathuriya was the son of King Thiri Raza. His mother was Sandhimala, the daughter of the celestial ruler Bhummasoe. He was born on the full moon day of the month of Pyatho, in the Sakkaraj year 72. At the age of 25, in Sakkaraj year 97, he ascended the throne and began his reign.

He had two sisters, Anjanadevi (အဉ္စနဒေဝီ) and Uddumbara Devi (ဥဒုမ္ဗရဒေဝီ).

== Reign and legacy ==
According to Arakanese chronicles, Buddhism was introduced to Arakan during the reign of King Chandra Suriya.

After ruling for 26 years, the King heard of the Buddha’s enlightenment and, desiring to honor Him, sent envoys with flowers and perfumes to invite him. At that time, the Buddha was dwelling in Veluvana Monastery in Rajagaha.

It is recorded that in 554 B.C., Lord Buddha, accompanied by 500 disciples, visited the city of Dhannyawadi. During this visit, King Chandra Suriya and his people embraced Buddhism. The king requested Lord Buddha to leave an image of Himself to commemorate the occasion, and the Mahamuni (Great Sage) image was created. It is said that after its casting, the Buddha breathed upon the image, giving it a special significance.

The Mahamuni image later became an important part of Arakanese history and identity. Early sculptures at the Mahamuni shrine at Dhannyawadi provide the first evidence of Buddhism’s presence in the region.

The Rakhine people show their utmost respect to King Chandra Suriya's role in introducing Buddhism and establishing the Mahamuni shrine.

== See also ==
- History of Rakhine
- Dhanyawadi
