= Washing =

Method of cleaning

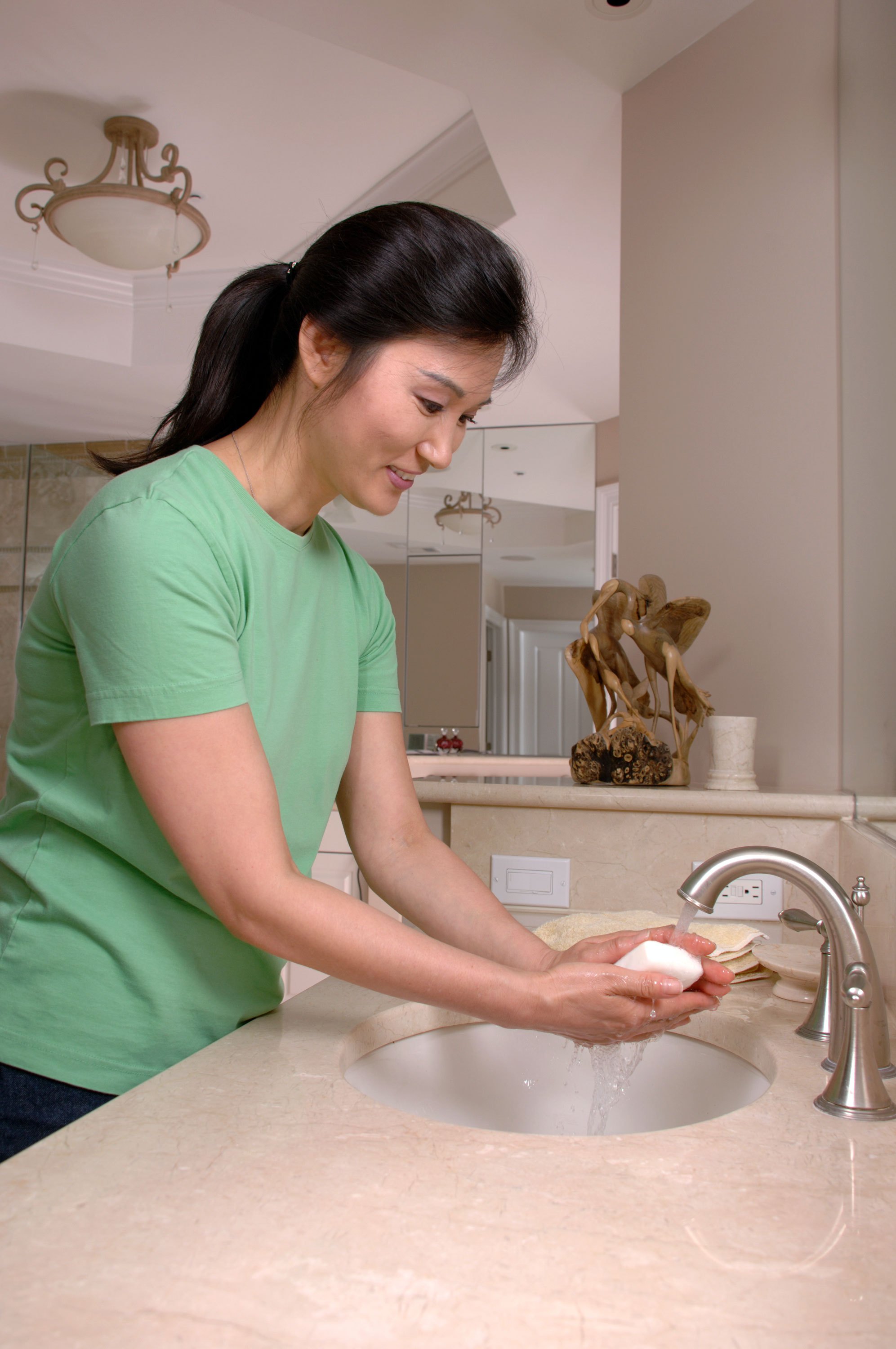
A woman washes her hands with soap and water

Washing is a method of cleaning, usually with water and soap or detergent. Regularly washing and then rinsing both body and clothing is an essential part of good hygiene and health.

Often people use soaps and detergents to assist in the emulsification of oils and dirt particles so they can be washed away. The soap can be applied directly, or with the aid of a washcloth or assisted with sponges or similar cleaning tools.

In social contexts, washing refers to the act of bathing, or washing different parts of the body, such as hands, hair, or faces. Excessive washing may damage the hair, causing dandruff, or cause rough skin/skin lesions. Some washing of the body is done ritually in religions like Christianity and Judaism, as an act of purification.

Washing can also refer to washing objects. For example, washing of clothing or other material items, like bedsheets, or washing dishes or cookware. Keeping objects clean, especially if they interact with food or the skin, can help with sanitation. Other kinds of washing focus on maintaining the cleanliness and durability of objects that get dirty, such as a car, which is washed by lathering the exterior with car soap.

== Washing bodies ==
People wash themselves, or bathe periodically for religious ritual or therapeutic purposes or as a recreational activity.

In Europe, some people use a bidet to wash their external genitalia and the anal region after using the toilet, instead of using toilet paper. The bidet is common in predominantly Catholic countries where water is considered essential for anal cleansing.

More frequent is washing of just the hands, e.g. before and after preparing food and eating, after using the toilet, after handling something dirty, etc. Hand washing is important in reducing the spread of germs. Also common is washing the face, which is done after waking up, or to keep cool during the day.

Ritual purification through washing includes acts like Maundy, a Christian ritual involving washing of the feet, or ceremonial washing in Judaism.

=== Bathing ===
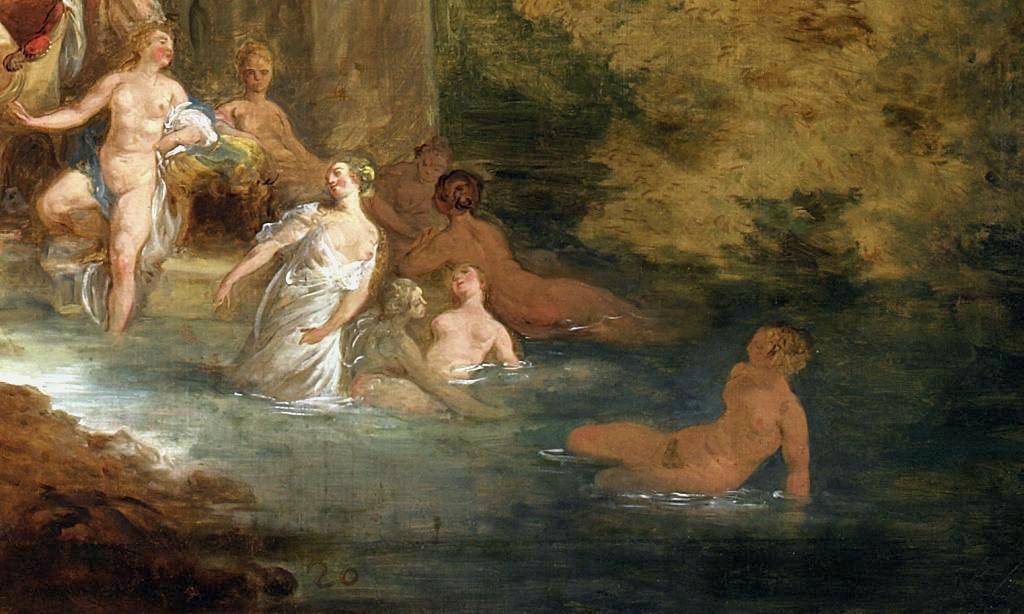
Detail of Jean-Pierre Norblin de La Gourdaine's Bath in the Park (1785)

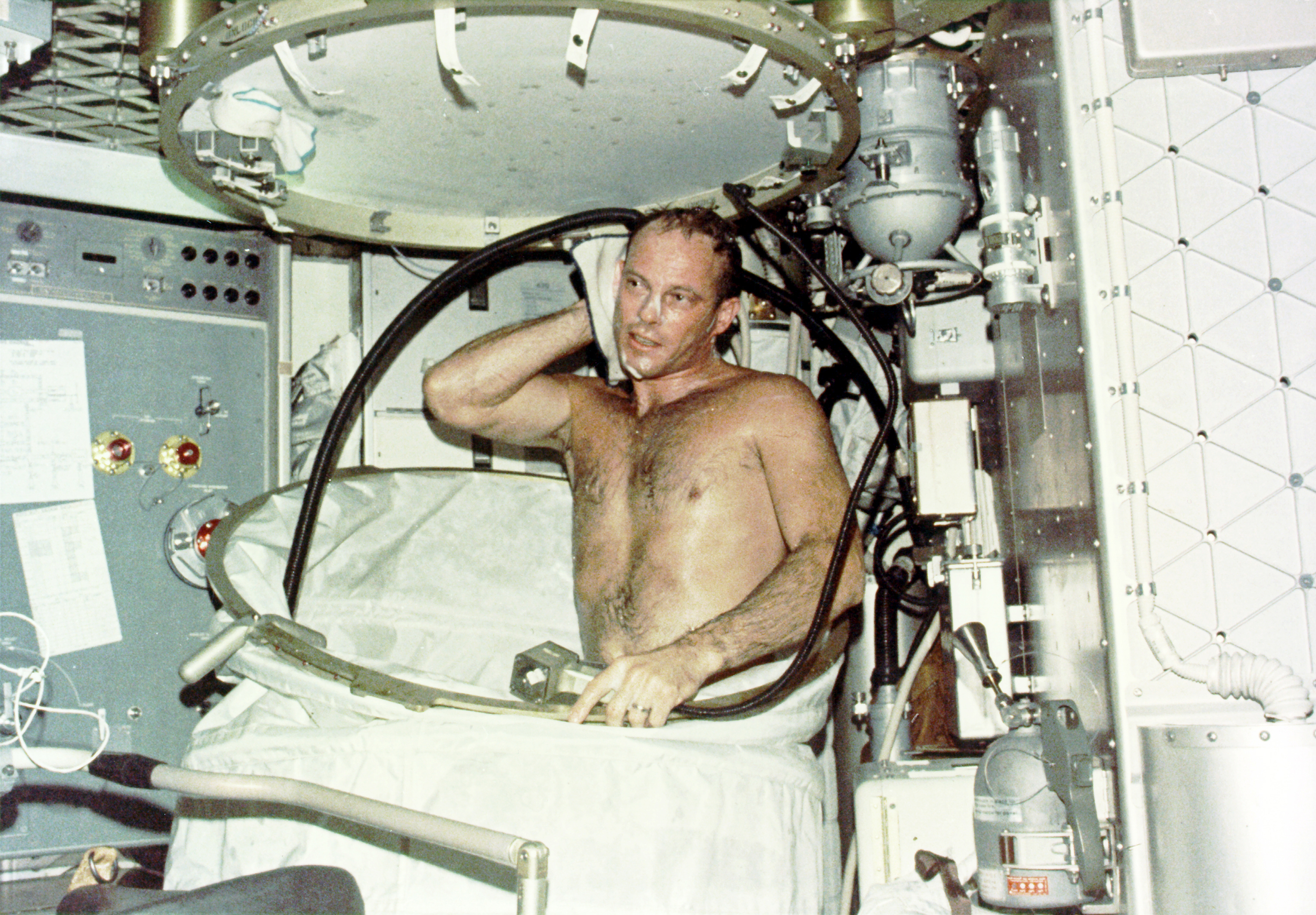
Astronaut Jack R. Lousma taking a shower in space, 1973

Bathing is the immersion of the body, wholly or partially, usually in water, but often in another medium such as hot air. It is most commonly practised as part of personal cleansing, and less frequently for relaxation or as a leisure activity. Cleansing the body may be solely a component of personal hygiene, but is also a spiritual part of some religious rituals. Bathing is also sometimes used medically or therapeutically, as in hydrotherapy, ice baths, or the mud bath.

People bathe in water at temperatures ranging from very cold to very hot, or in appropriately heated air, according to custom or purpose.

Where indoor heated water is available, people bathe more or less daily, at comfortable temperatures, in a private bathtub or shower. Communal bathing, such as that in hammams, sauna, banya, Victorian Turkish baths, and sentō, fulfils the same purpose, in addition to its often having a social function.

Ritual religious bathing is sometimes referred to as immersion. This can be required after sexual intercourse or menstruation (Islam and Judaism), or as baptism (Christianity).

By analogy, the term "bathing" is also applied to relaxing activities in which the participant "bathes" in the rays of the sun (sunbathing) or in outdoor bodies of water, such as in sea bathing or wild swimming.

Although there is sometimes overlap, as in sea bathing, most bathing is usually treated as distinct from more active recreations like swimming.

=== Hand washing ===
Hand washing (or handwashing), also called hand hygiene, is the process of cleaning the hands with soap or handwash and water to eliminate bacteria, viruses, dirt, microorganisms, and other potentially harmful substances. Drying of the washed hands is part of the process as wet and moist hands are more easily recontaminated. If soap and water are unavailable, hand sanitizer that is at least 60% (v/v) alcohol in water can be used as long as hands are not visibly excessively dirty or greasy. Hand hygiene is central to preventing the spread of infectious diseases in home and everyday life settings. Meta-analyses have shown that regular hand washing in community settings can significantly reduce respiratory and gastrointestinal infections.

The World Health Organization (WHO) recommends washing hands for at least 20 seconds before and after certain activities. These include the five critical times during the day where washing hands with soap is important to reduce fecal-oral transmission of disease: after using the toilet (for urination, defecation, menstrual hygiene), after cleaning a child's bottom (changing diapers), before feeding a child, before eating and before/after preparing food or handling raw meat, fish, or poultry.

When neither hand washing nor using hand sanitizer is possible, hands can be cleaned with uncontaminated ash and clean water, although the benefits and risks are uncertain for reducing the spread of viral or bacterial infections. However, frequent hand washing can lead to skin damage due to drying of the skin. Moisturizing lotion is often recommended to keep the hands from drying out; dry skin can lead to skin damage, which can increase the risk for the transmission of infection.

=== Hair washing ===
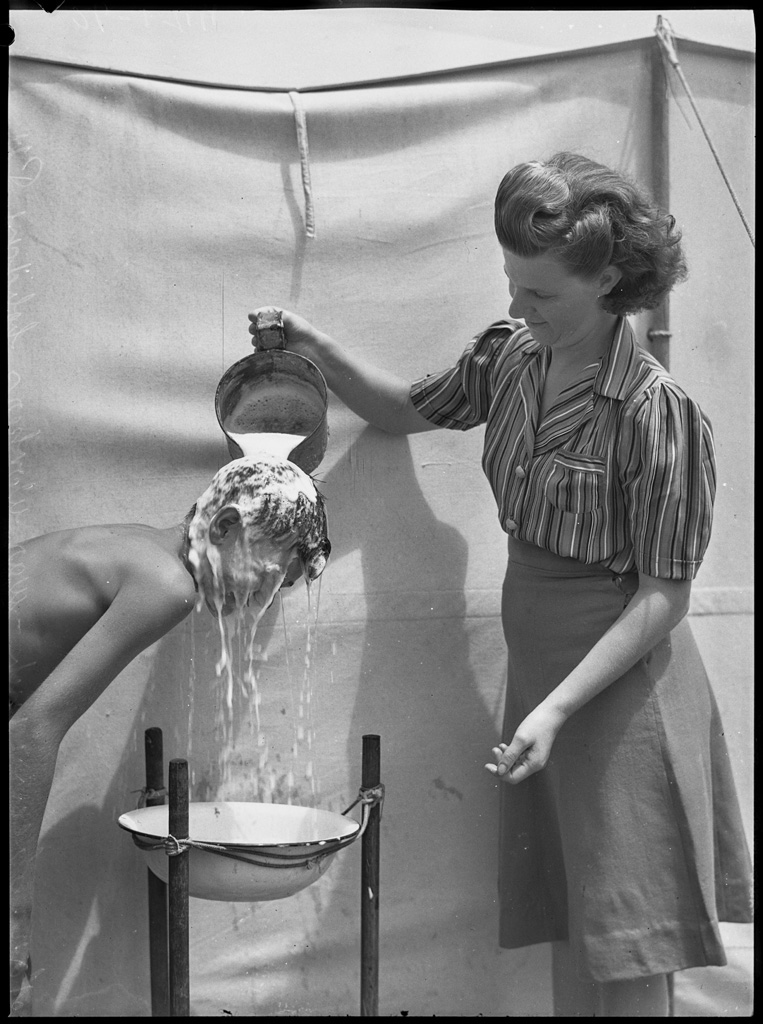
Boy getting his hair washed, Narrabeen war workers holiday camp, 26 January 1944

Hair washing is the cosmetic act of keeping hair clean by washing it. To remove sebum from hair, people apply a surfactant, usually shampoo (sometimes soap) to wet hair and lather. The surfactant and the dirt that has bonded to it are then rinsed out with water.

There are also dry shampoos: powders that help remove sebum from hair by absorbing it prior to being combed out. People may use dry shampoo to postpone their hair wash or to save time. Dry shampoo is sometimes used in situations when someone is bedridden.

Hair washing and dry shampoo are both used with the intention of keeping the hair healthy, adding volume to the hair, removing dirt and odors, and removing oils from the scalp.

Washing hair regularly can also help control scalp conditions and reduce the risk of infection.

=== Face washing ===
Man washing his face with only water

Face washing, also known as facial cleanliness or face cleansing, is a form of washing in order to remove dirt, germs, oil, debris, and any unwanted materials on the face, possibly with the use of soap or cleansing agent and water. These dirt or unwanted substances from cosmetic products and the environment are hardly soluble in water. The addition of face cleansing products in daily face washing can help effectively eliminate undesirable materials by breaking them down into smaller particles.

The practice of face washing originates from ancient times and possesses cultural significance. Its purpose then experiences changes and adaptations to societal developments. In humans, 4 main skin types were identified by Helena Rubinstein in the 1900s, and a variety of face washing products started to arise respective to the needs of each skin type. A person's skincare routine can employ different face washing products and techniques according to their needs. When face washing is not done well, or with unsuitable products used, possible risks can arise and affect the condition of the skin instead. Appropriate techniques can be applied to minimise any harm brought to the facial skin during face washing.

== Washing items ==
=== Dishwashing ===
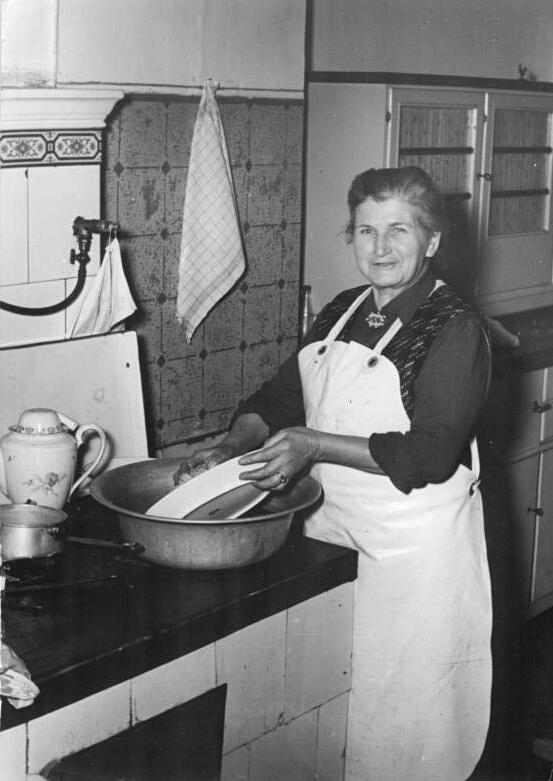
Handwashing dishes in Germany, 1951

Dishwashing, washing the dishes, doing the dishes, or (in Britain) washing up, is the process of cleaning food-soiled items, such as tableware and kitchen utensils. This hygiene practice has existed for centuries and helps to prevent foodborne illness. This is either done by hand in a sink (or tub), usually using tap water and cleaning agents (which may include a soap or detergent, degreaser, water softening agent, etc.) or, since the early 1900s, by using a dishwasher, a specialized appliance. Dishwashing may take place in a kitchen, utility room, scullery or outside. In commercial settings, dishwashing is generally done by a professional dishwasher.

=== Clothes washing ===
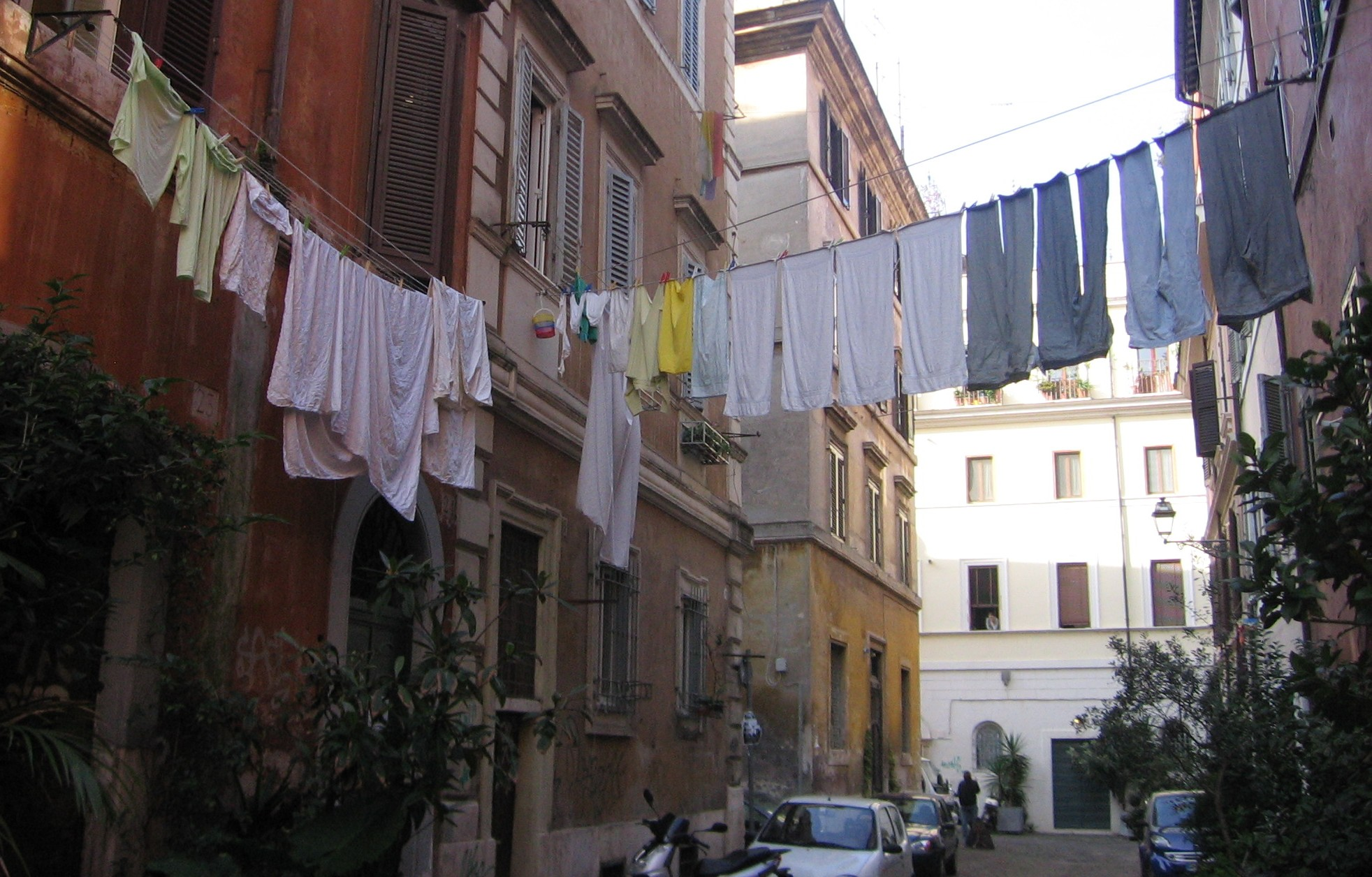
Laundry is hung to dry above an Italian street.

Laundry is the washing of clothing and other textiles, and, more broadly, their drying and ironing as well. Laundry has been part of history since humans began to wear clothes, so the methods by which different cultures have dealt with this universal human need are of interest to several branches of scholarship.

Laundry work has traditionally been highly gendered, with the responsibility in most cultures falling to women (formerly known as laundresses or washerwomen). The Industrial Revolution gradually led to mechanized solutions to laundry work, notably the washing machine and later the tumble dryer. Laundry, like cooking and child care, is still done both at home and by commercial establishments outside the home.

The word "laundry" may refer to the clothing itself, or to the place where the cleaning happens. An individual home may have a laundry room; a utility room includes, but is not restricted to, the function of washing clothes. An apartment building or student hall of residence may have a shared laundry facility. A stand-alone business is referred to as a self-service laundry (launderette in British English or laundromat in North American English).

=== Washing cars ===
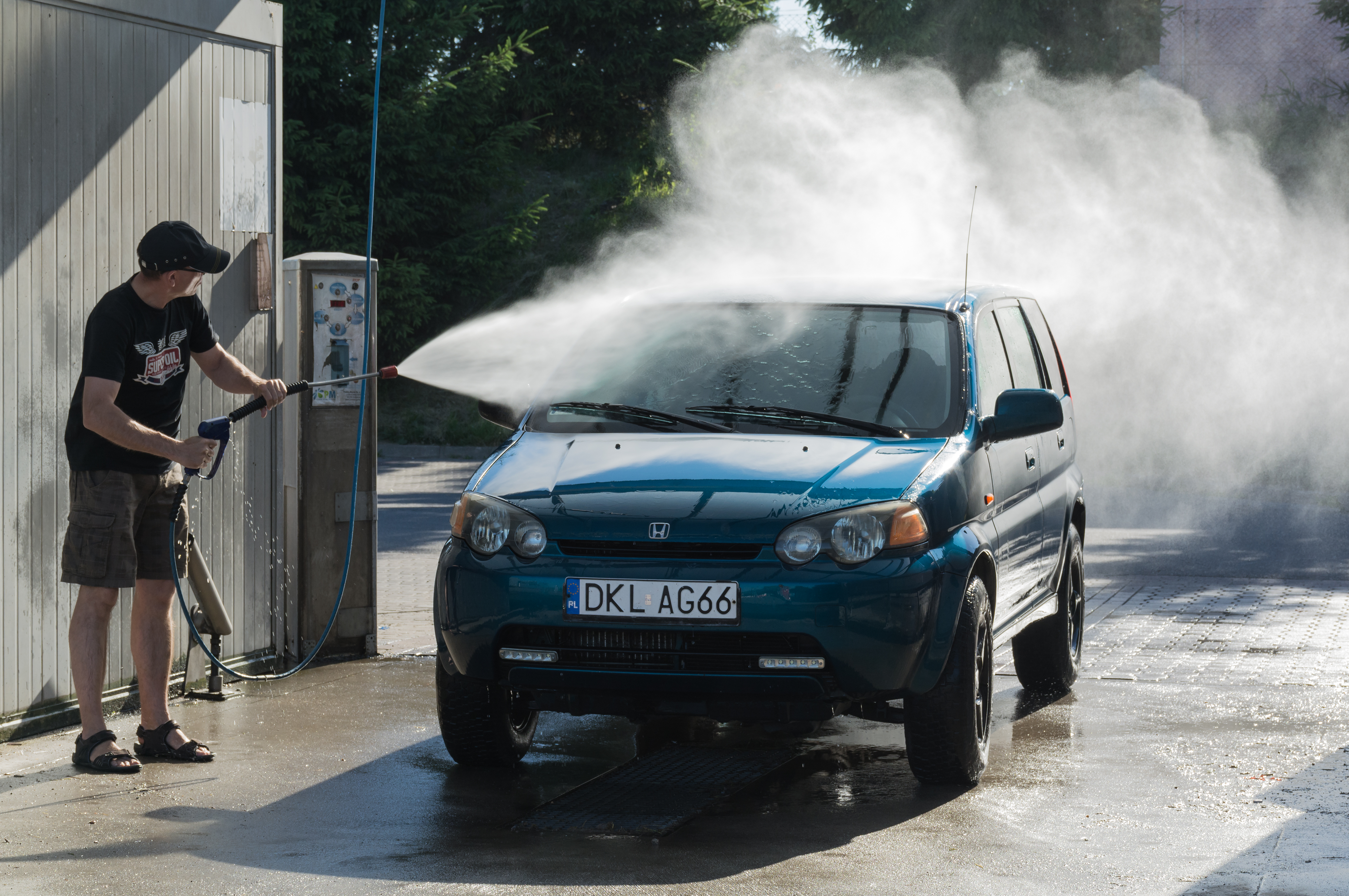
A self-service car wash in Kłodzko, Poland

A car wash, or auto wash, is a facility used to clean the exterior, and in some cases the interior, of cars. Car washes can be self-service, full-service (with attendants who wash the vehicle), or fully automated (possibly connected to a filling station). Car washes may also be events where people pay to have their cars washed by volunteers, often using less specialized equipment, as a fundraiser.

== See also ==
- Cleaning agent
- Cleanliness
- Hygiene
- Hygiene in Christianity
- Laundry symbols, washing machine
- Sanitation
