= Face washing =

Personal hygiene practice

Man washing his face with only water

Face washing, also known as facial cleanliness or face cleansing, is a form of washing in order to remove dirt, germs, oil, debris, and any unwanted materials on the face, possibly with the use of soap or cleansing agent and water. These dirt or unwanted substances from cosmetic products and the environment are hardly soluble in water. The addition of face cleansing products in daily face washing can help effectively eliminate undesirable materials by breaking them down into smaller particles.

The practice of face washing originates from ancient times and possesses cultural significance. Its purpose then experiences changes and adaptations to societal developments. In humans, 4 main skin types were identified by Helena Rubinstein in the 1900s, and a variety of face washing products started to arise respective to the needs of each skin type. A person's skincare routine can employ different face washing products and techniques according to their needs. When face washing is not done well, or with unsuitable products used, possible risks can arise and affect the condition of the skin instead. Appropriate techniques can be applied to minimise any harm brought to the facial skin during face washing.

== History and cultural significance ==
Before face washing was known to be for hygiene purposes, humans started the practice of face washing for religious or cultural rituals back in history. It started with simply scraping off the skin using objects like stones. Across different civilisation, humans started to discover soap making, and naturally incorporated the use of soap to help with face washing. One of the earliest record soap making processes is seen in Sumerian clay tablets in 2000 BC. In 600 BC, plants and natural substances like tree ash and animal fat were added to soap made by Phoenicians. Romans similarly discovered the formation of soap around Mount Sapo. In modern days, saponification is the process used to make soaps of all kinds. The idea of using soap for face washing continued to expand and develop to fulfil humans' needs. Plant extracts are still seen to be added to face cleansers available in the market due to a wide range of proven benefits.

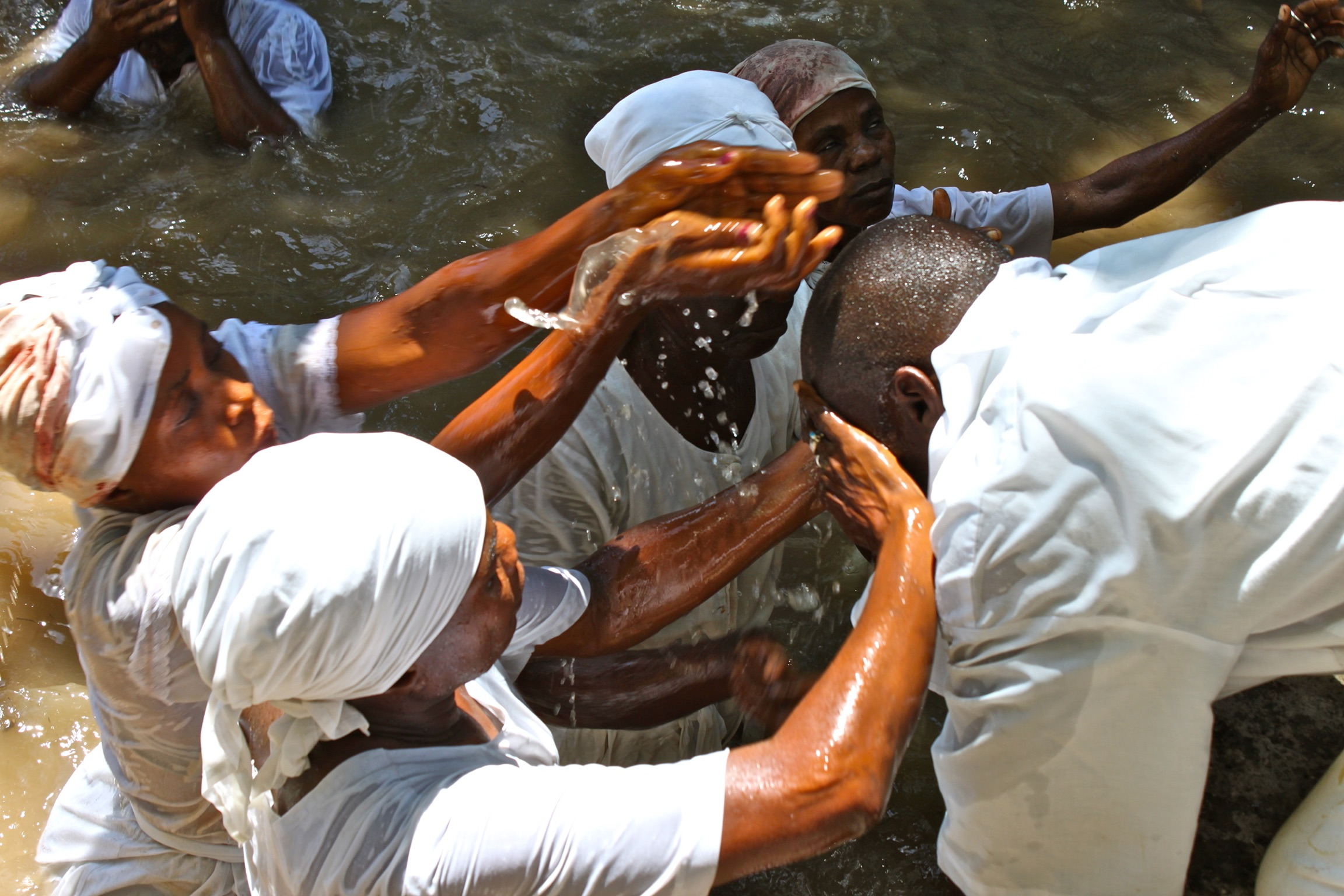
Group of men washing their faces for religious purposes

The face is seen as an important part of the human body to represent the image of an individual, especially in the East Asian community. In such case, a person's appearance plays a significant role in upholding moral values, which makes face washing, or maintaining face hygiene to be a crucial practice. Face washing serves as a step of moral purification. This concept has then slowly evolved to serve as a means of relaxation. The focus shifts and embeds to the aspect of healthy skin and appearance in theory nowadays, with more cleansing products invented aiming to improve the quality of face washing. These products contain different ingredients, scents, colours to offer a variety of skincare benefits.

== Purpose of face washing ==
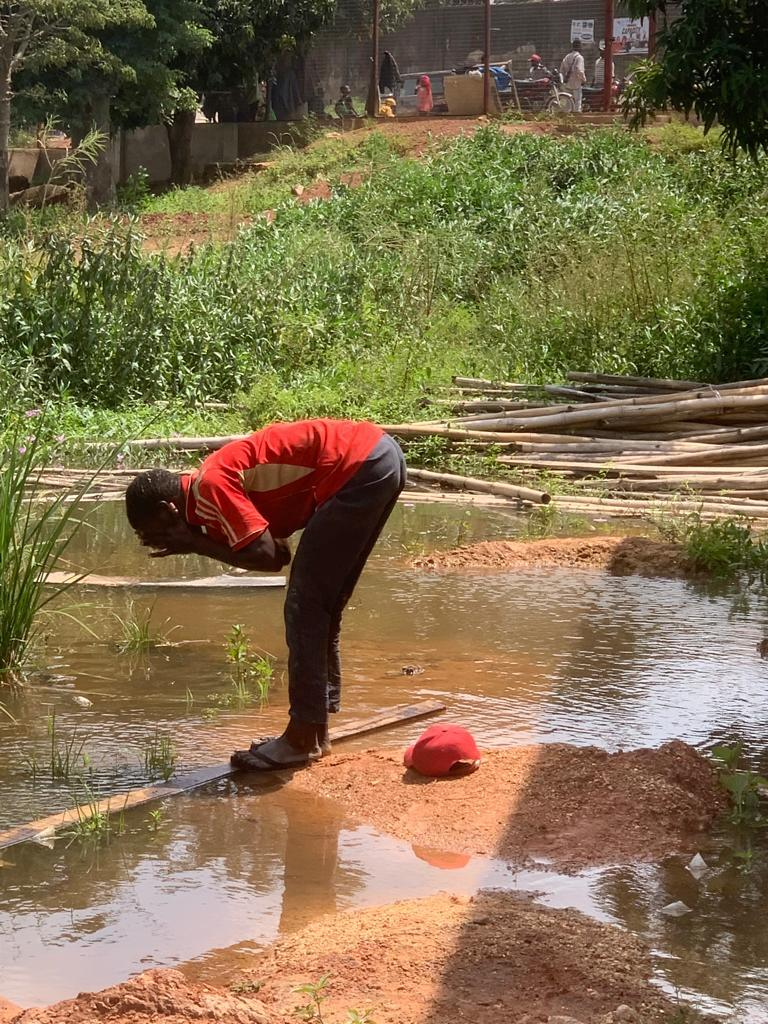
A child washing his face in a stream while traveling.

In addition to the historical and cultural significance of face washing, it is a fundamental action in a person's daily routine, as it maintains skin hygiene and promotes skin health. This is effective in eliminating dirt, oil, and debris that settle on the skin's surface in everyday life.

=== Maintaining skin hygiene and cleanliness to promote skin health ===
Face washing can maintain skin hygiene by effectively eliminating the accumulated dirt, oil, and debris that settle on the skin's surface during the day.

This is important for getting rid of pollutants, excess sebum secretion, and other impurities that can clog the pores and lead to breakouts or skin problems, often common in oily skin types. Regularly cleansing the face can contribute to overall skin health by preventing the buildup of bacteria and reducing the risk of skin conditions such as acne, blackheads, and other blemishes.

=== Preparing the Skin for Other Skincare Routines ===
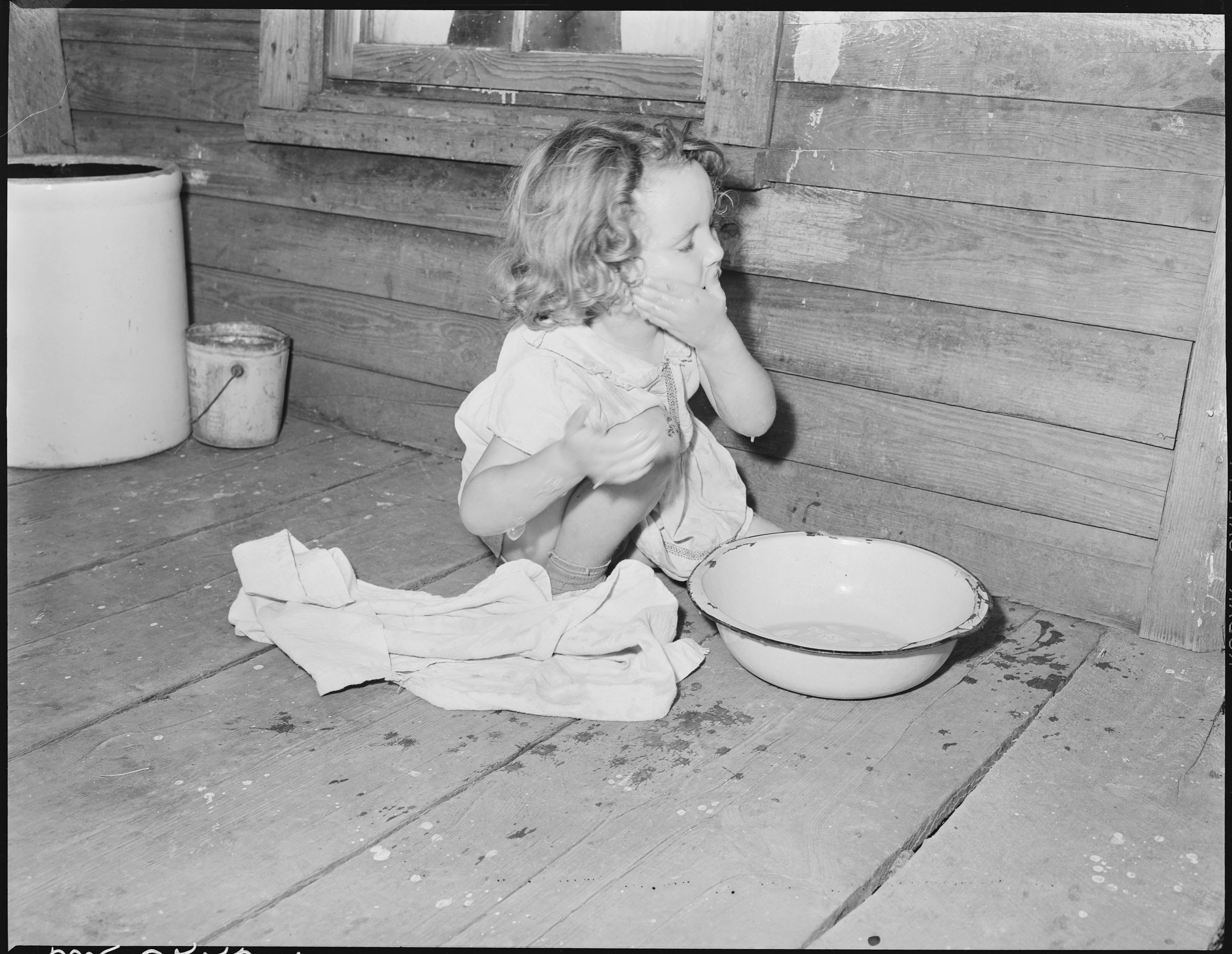
A child washing her face in the early 20th century in the United States, using a wash basin.

Face-washing also serves as a preparatory step for other skincare routines, such as applying moisturisers, serums, or treatments. This is particularly common with people who use makeup. It ensures that the skin is clean and ready to absorb the beneficial ingredients of subsequent products, no matter for a night routine, or for the pre-makeup products.

== Skin types ==
Although components of the skin carry out similar functions among individuals, skin properties can differ between one another. Helena Rubinstein identified four main skin types in the 1900s – dry, oily, combination and sensitive. There is also normal skin type that describes a well-balanced condition of the skin. These skin types are classified based on factors like the amount of sebum and level of skin hydration.

Dry skin, also known as xerosis, describes the condition when skin appears to be dull and rough, with pores hardly to be seen. A person with dry skin is more prone to experiencing itch, and redness, as there is a reduced hydration in their skin.

Oily skin can be easily observed and identified by its enlarged pores and greasy appearance. It is closely related to excess sebum excretion, and can often lead to dermatologic issues like acne.

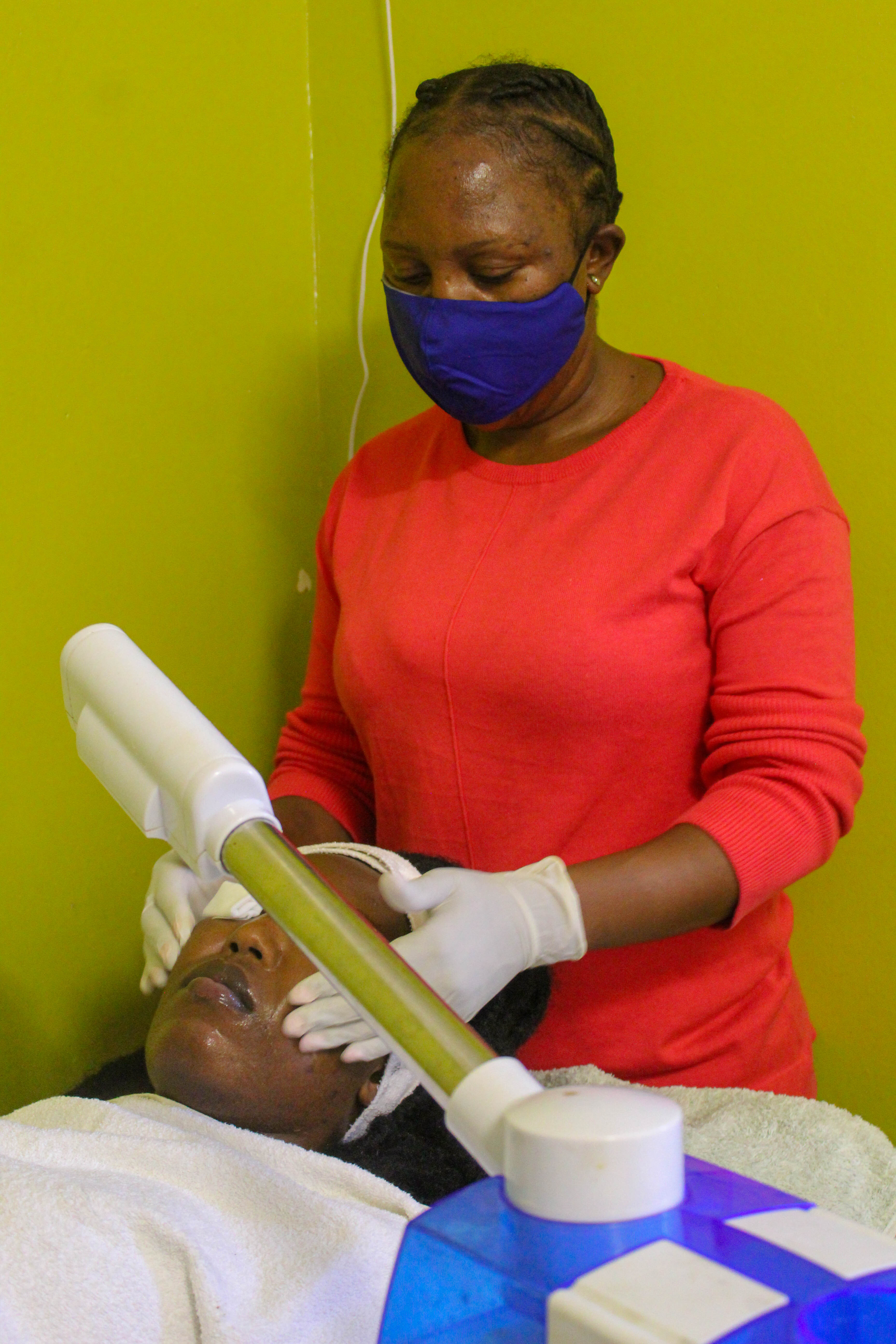
A woman in Botswana receiving a facial cleaning service at a wellness provider.

Combination skin is the most common skin type. It refers to a person's skin where some regions are dry and some regions are oily.

Sensitive skin is a special condition when a person's skin is hyperactive or hypersensitive towards external stimuli. With a weakened barrier in protecting the skin, stimuli like heat, pain, itch and electrical can have greater effect in individuals. This condition also results in a higher prevalence of suffering from cutaneous disorders like acne, rosacea, skin allergies and more.

== Face washing products and components ==
=== Cleansers ===
Facial cleansers usually contain common substances such as water, surfactants, moisturisers, and water-binders. Some can include preservatives to prevent microorganisms from growing, or fragrances to eliminate the smell of surfactants.

Surfactant, also known as surface-active agents or emulsifiers, is the major component in common cleansers available for face washing products. It determines the main properties of the product and its washing effects. When a surfactant comes in contact with water, it shifts to an interface, which describes the area between the surfactant and skin, or the area between the surfactant and air. While this process occurs, it helps lower the tension in between layers, and encourages dirt particles and oil to come out as bubbles form. Surfactants can be in ionic, nonionic, or silicon-containing forms.

Cleansers can have a mixture of several surfactants to amplify its effects or foaming properties. Common surfactants include soap and synthetic detergents. While the addition of surfactants in facial cleansers is essential in removing unwanted materials, the skin barrier may be damaged as the lipid structures are being disrupted under the skin. This issue leads to the improvement of facial cleansers across time, hoping to lighten the damages brought by cleansers on the skin as much as possible.

=== Facial toners ===
Facial toners compose the second step of face washing. They aim to remove excess sebum secretions after the use of cleanser, and create a mild exfoliating effect for the skin. This helps reduce the stressing sensation of the skin and provide sufficient hydration to secure active ingredients for skin rejuvenation. Toners can provide mild effects to the skin by acting as fresheners after cleansing, as well as bringing stronger impacts to the skin with the involvement of astringents and acids.

Toners can be alcoholic which features denatured ethanol, or non-alcoholic. Toners with specific benefits such as anti-acne or botanically infused toners have observed rising opportunities in recent years.

== Risks of face washing ==
While face washing brings benefits to maintain skin hygiene, the action of washing the face can promote risks if it is not done properly or with the use of wrong and unsuitable products.

=== Over-washing and stripping the skin ===
Important oils from your skin can be completely removed or stripped away with excessive washing of the face. Without the essential oils for your face, it can disrupt your skin's protective barrier, leading to uncomfortable skin symptoms like itchy, flaky skin. The face's sebaceous glands may also overcompensate by producing more oil when the skin is stripped of essential oils, leading to clogged pores and an increased risk of breakouts and acne.

Compromised skin may also be more susceptible to germ infections and delayed healing. With a compromised protective barrier to your face, wounding may occur and it would introduce a myriad of microbes to the injury site.

=== Disruption of the skin's pH balance ===
The face's acid mantle, a very fine film on the skin, can be damaged by face washing processes, especially when using high alkalinity soaps and cleansers.

Washing the face repetitively, especially with harsh cleansers or alkaline products, can disturb the skin's pH balance, negatively affecting the stratum corneum and its barrier functions, leading to increased water loss, dryness, heightened sensitivity, and a higher susceptibility to infections and skin disorders. It is important to use gentle cleansers with a pH that is close to the skin's natural pH to maintain a healthy skin barrier.

=== Allergic reactions ===
Acne and redness on a male's forehead

Allergic reactions may happen to individuals after certain face washing experiences, including changing to a new facial cleanser. Facial cleansers may include certain ingredients that some individuals are sensitive to, manifesting reactions such as redness, itching, swelling, or rashes.

For individuals who experience allergic reactions after using new products, it is recommended to read ingredient labels carefully when purchasing facial cleansers and to consult a doctor if necessary.

== See also ==
- Washstand
