= Shweinbin Monastery =

Buddhist monastery in Mandalay, Myanmar

- ရွှေအင်ပင်ကျောင်း
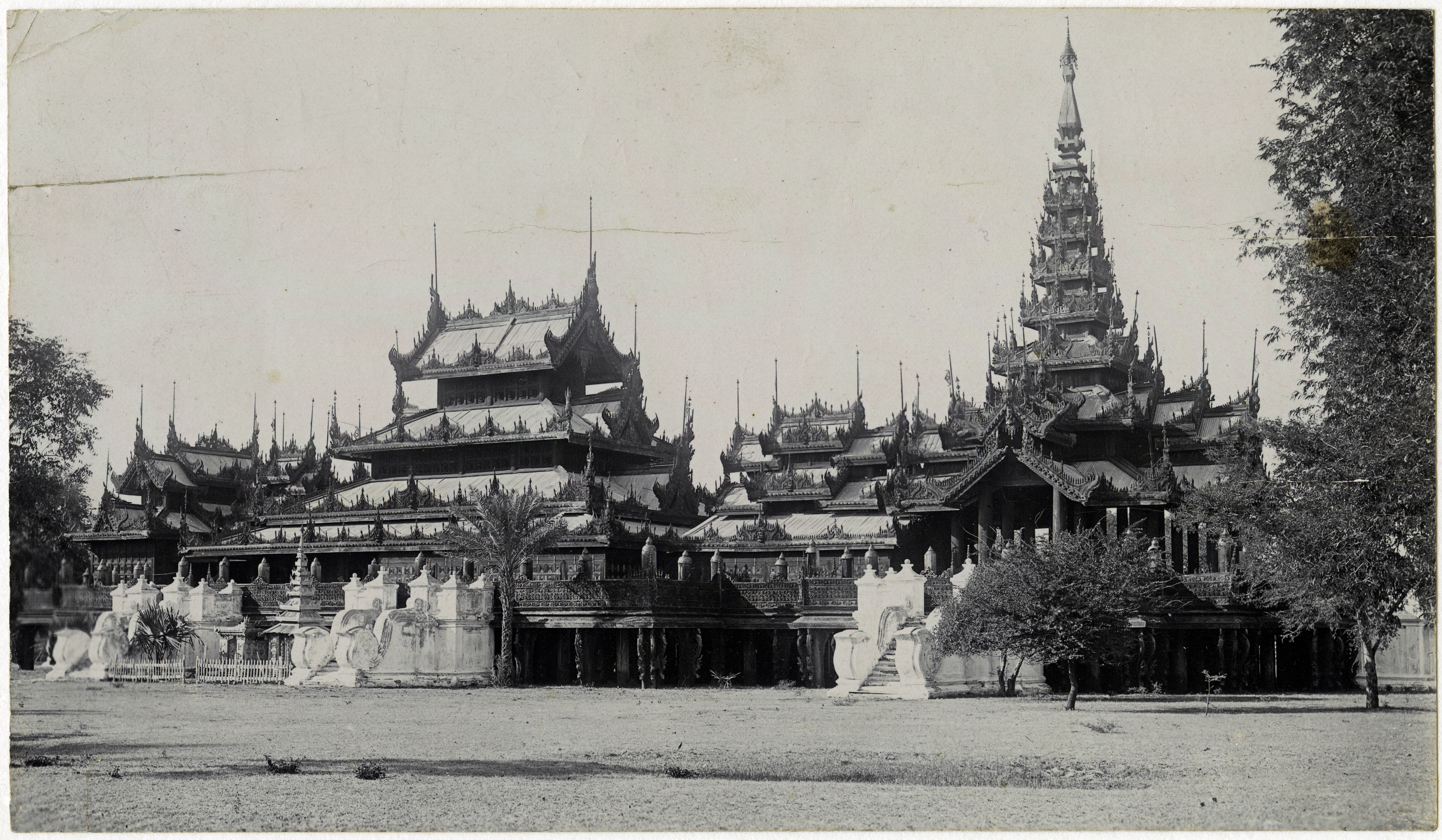
- Shweinbin Monastery around 1900.

- Location within Myanmar

Religion
- Affiliation: Theravada Buddhism

Location
- Country: Mandalay, Mandalay Region, Burma
- Interactive map of Shweinbin Monastery
- Coordinates: 21.966280°N 96.065954°E

Architecture
- Completed: 1895; 131 years ago

Shweinbin Monastery (Burmese: ရွှေအင်ပင်ကျောင်း) is a Buddhist monastery in Mandalay, Burma, built in the tradition of Burmese teak architecture. The monastery was built in 1895 by a Sino-Burmese merchant married to a Burmese woman of royal extraction. The monastery's construction strictly adheres to traditional rules of Burmese monastic architecture and includes all of the designated pyatthat-crowned pavilions.

== See also ==
- Atumashi Monastery
- Myadaung Monastery
- Salin Monastery
- Shwenandaw Monastery
- Taiktaw Monastery
