= Yaw Mingyi Monastery =

Buddhist monastery in Mandalay, Myanmar

- ယောမင်းကြီးအုတ်ကျောင်း
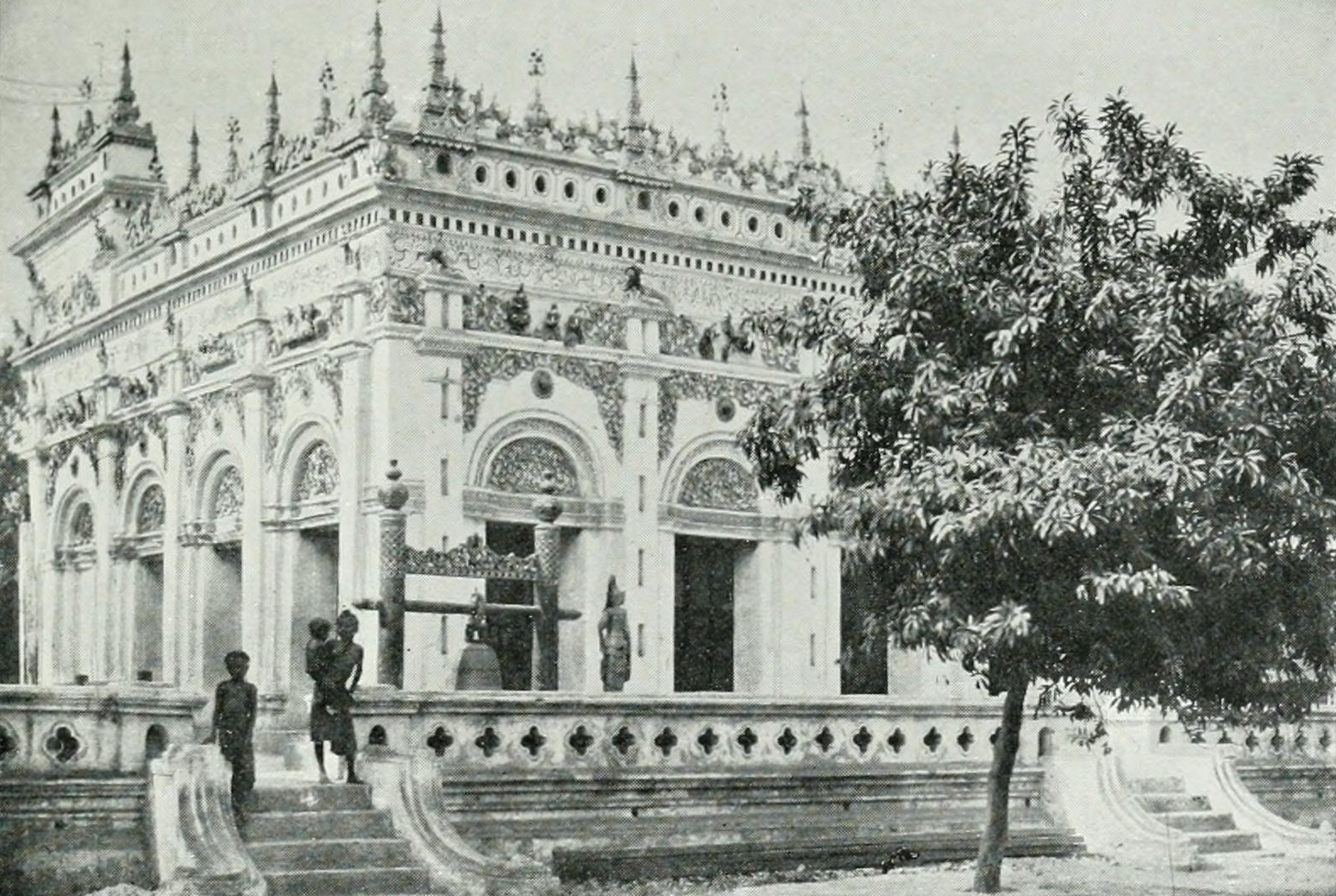

- Location within Myanmar

Religion
- Affiliation: Theravada Buddhism

Location
- Country: Mandalay, Mandalay Region, Burma
- Interactive map of Yaw Mingyi Monastery
- Coordinates: 22.015568°N 96.096170°E

Architecture
- Founder: Pho Hlaing
- Completed: 1866; 160 years ago

Yaw Mingyi Monastery (Burmese: ယောမင်းကြီးအုတ်ကျောင်း) is a Buddhist monastery in Mandalay, Burma, built in 1866 under the patronage of Pho Hlaing, the Yaw Mingyi. Unlike classic Burmese monasteries, the Yaw Mingyi Monastery was a brick monastery modeled after a hotel the Yaw Mingyi had seen while traveling in Southern Italy, and as such, adopts European flourishes and is extravagantly carved in plaster. It was located near the Salin Monastery. The monastery was burned down all wooden infrastructure, remained only brick structure during World War II during the Allied bombing of Mandalay.

== See also ==
- Kyaung
- Atumashi Monastery
- Myadaung Monastery
- Salin Monastery
- Shwenandaw Monastery
- Taiktaw Monastery
