= Kyaung =

Buddhist monasteries in Myanmar

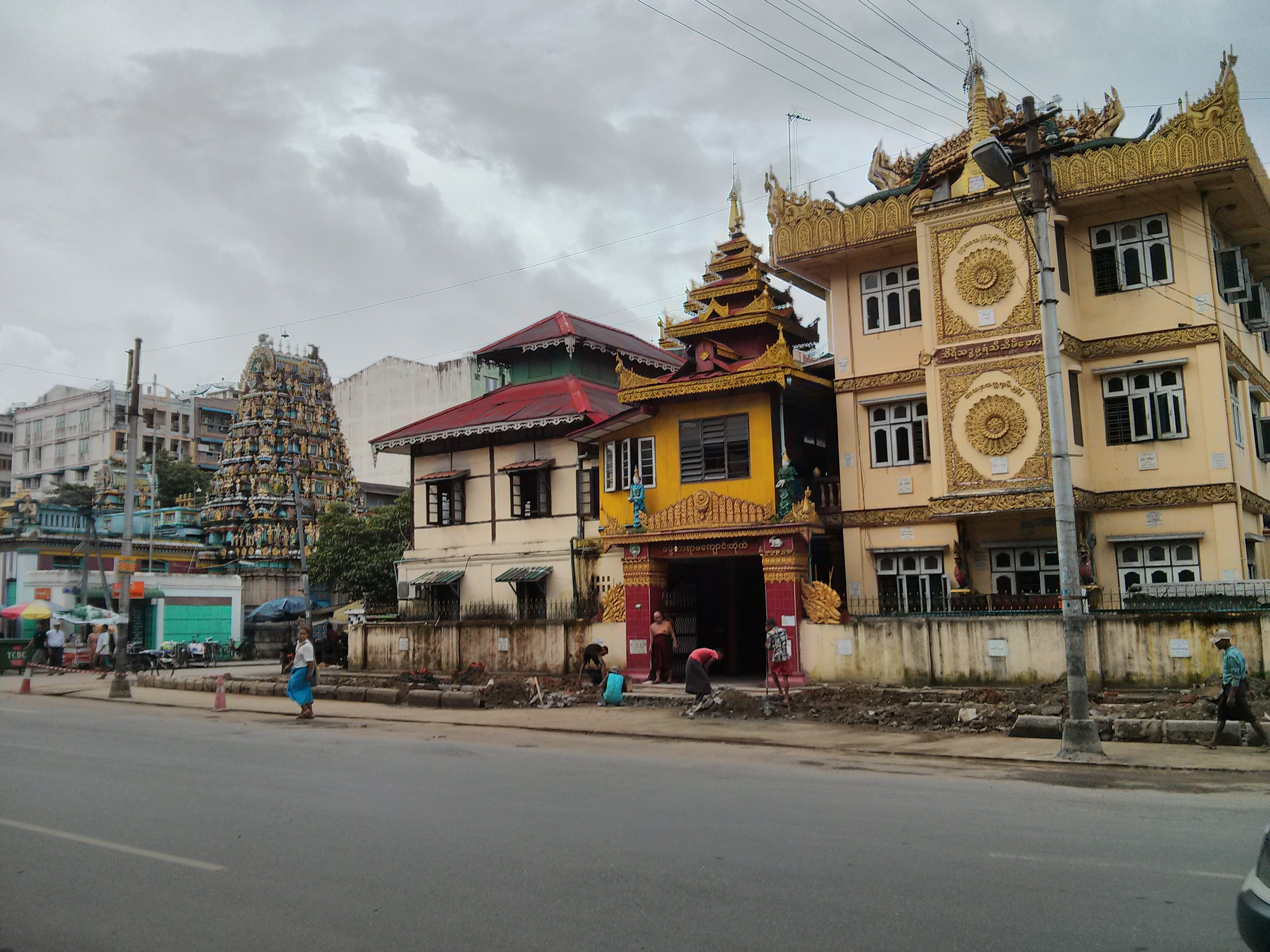
An urban kyaung on Anawrahta Road in Yangon

A kyaung (Burmese: ဘုန်းကြီးကျောင်း, MLCTS: bhun:kyi: kyaung:, [pʰóʊɰ̃dʑí tɕáʊɰ̃]) is a monastery (vihara), comprising the domestic quarters and workplaces of Buddhist monks. Burmese kyaungs are sometimes also occupied by novice monks (samanera), lay attendants (kappiya), nuns (thilashin), and white-robed acolytes (ဖိုးသူတော် phothudaw).

The kyaung has traditionally been the center of village life in Burma, serving as both the educational institution for children and a community center, especially for merit-making activities such as construction of buildings, offering of food to monks and celebration of Buddhist festivals, and observance of uposatha. Monasteries are not established by members of the sangha, but by laypersons who donate land or money to support the establishment.

Kyaungs are typically built of wood, meaning that few historical monasteries built before the 1800s are extant. Kyaungs exist in Myanmar (Burma), as well as in neighboring countries with Theravada Buddhist communities, including neighboring China (e.g., Dehong Dai and Jingpo Autonomous Prefecture). According to 2016 statistics published by the State Sangha Maha Nayaka Committee, Myanmar is home to 62,649 kyaungs and 4,106 nunneries. Burmese monasteries are typically built on land zoned for monasteries, pagodas, or allotted by the government. In urban centres, monasteries tend to cluster together, due to lack of available land.

== Usage and etymology ==
The modern Burmese language term kyaung (ကျောင်း) descends from the Old Burmese word kloṅ (က္လောင်). The strong connection between religion and schooling is reflected by fact that the kyaung is the same word now used to refer to secular schools. Kyaung is also used to describe Christian churches, Hindu temples, and Chinese temples. Mosques are an exception, as they use the term word bali (ဗလီ), which is derived from the Tamil word for 'school.'

Kyaung has also been borrowed into Tai languages, including into Shan as kyong (spelt ၵျွင်း or ၵျေႃင်း) and into Tai Nuea as zông^{2} (ᥓᥩᥒᥰ, rendered in Chinese as Chinese: 奘房).

== Types ==
The Burmese-Pali commentaries of Cullavagga identify five types of Buddhist monasteries, each typified by distinct architectural features. In practice, from an architectural standpoint, there are 3 main types of monasteries:

1. Monasteries with contiguous roofs,
2. Monasteries with cross-shaped roofs, and
3. Staging monasteries and staging halls

In modern-day Myanmar, kyaungs may be divided into a number of categories, including monastic colleges called sathintaik (Burmese: စာသင်တိုက်, MLCTS: casang.tuik), remote forest monasteries called tawya kyaung (Burmese: တောရကျောင်း, MLCTS: tau:ra. kyaung:), and monastic schools called ba ka kyaung (ဘကကျောင်း). Myanmar's primary monastic university towns are Bago, Pakokku, and Sagaing.

== History ==
=== Pre-colonial origins ===
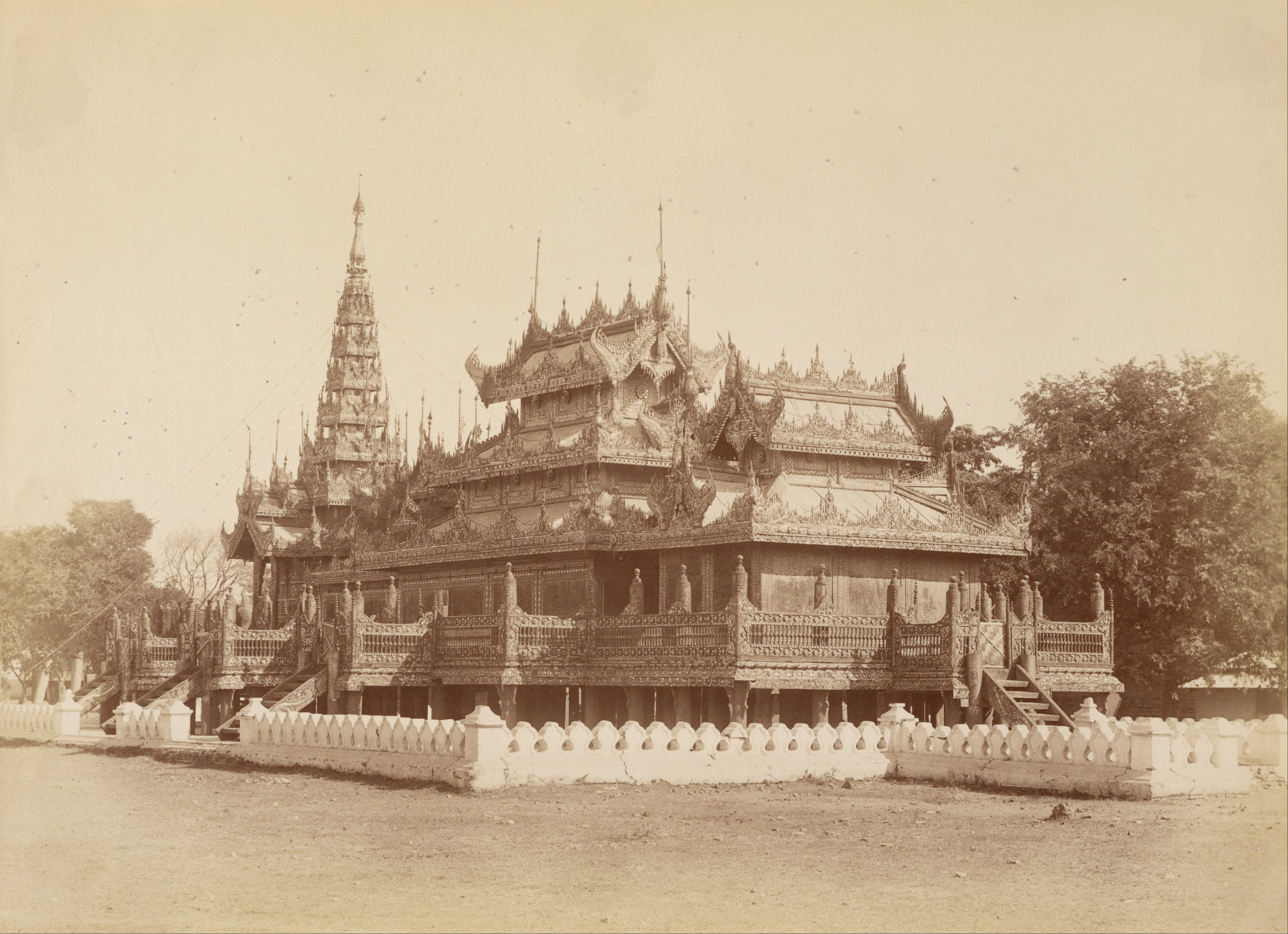
A traditional wooden monastery.

In pre-colonial times, the kyaung served as the primary source of education, providing nearly universal education for boys, representing the "bastion of civilization and knowledge" and "integral to the social fabric of pre-colonial Burma." The connections between kyaungs and education were reinforced by monastic examinations, which were first instituted in 1648 by King Thalun during the Taungoo Dynasty. Classical learning was transmitted through monasteries, which served as venues for Burmese students to pursue higher education and further social advancement in the royal administration after disrobing. Indeed, nearly all prominent historical figures such as Kinwun Mingyi U Kaung spent their formative years studying at monasteries.

Traditional monastic education first developed in the Pagan Kingdom, in tandem with the proliferation of Theravada Buddhism learning in the 1100s. The syllabus at kyaungs included the Burmese language, Pali grammar and Buddhist texts with a focus on discipline, morality and code of conduct (such as Mangala Sutta, Sigalovada Sutta, Dhammapada, and Jataka tales), prayers and elementary arithmetic. Influential monasteries held vast libraries of manuscripts and texts. The ubiquity of monastic education was attributed with the high literacy rate for Burmese Buddhist men. The 1901 Census of India found that 60.3% of Burmese Buddhist men over twenty were literate, as compared to 10% for British India as a whole.

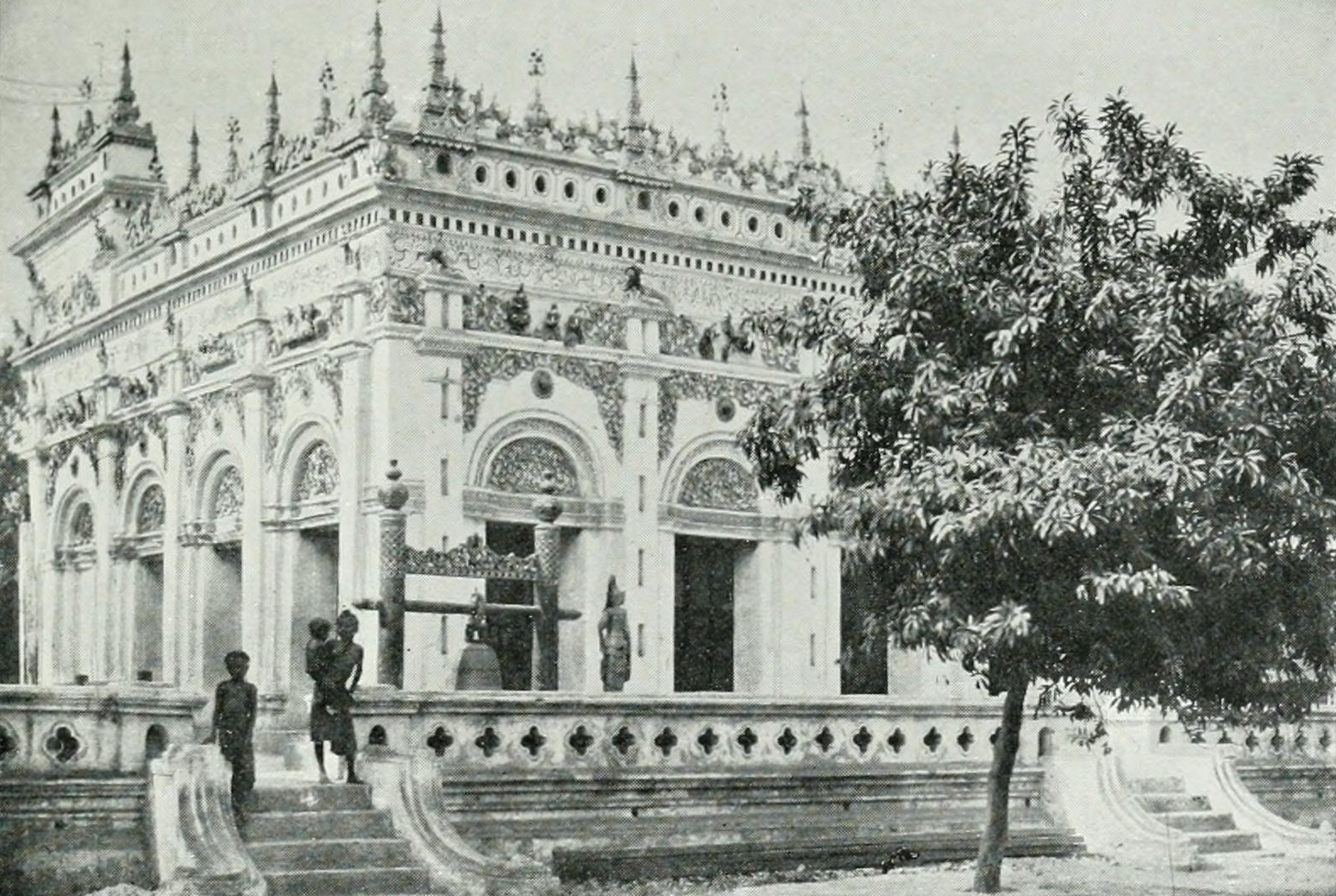
Yaw Mingyi Monastery, a brick monastery in Mandalay modeled after a hotel in Southern Italy.

Kyaungs called pwe kyaungs (ပွဲကျောင်း) also taught secular subjects, such as astronomy, astrology, medicine, massage, divination, horsemanship, swordsmanship, archery, arts and crafts, boxing, wrestling, music and dancing. During the Konbaung Dynasty, various kings, including Bodawpaya suppressed the proliferation of pwe kyaung, which were seen as potential venues for rebellions.

Sumptuary law dictated the construction and ornamentation of Burmese kyaungs, which were among the few building structures in pre-colonial Burma to possess elaborate multi-tiered roofs called pyatthat. Mason balustrades characterized royal monasteries.

=== Modern era ===
Following the abolishment of the Burmese monarchy at the end of the Third Anglo-Burmese War, monastic schools were largely superseded by secular, government-run schools.

In recent decades, monasteries have expanded to provide social welfare services; these are called parahita kyaung (ပရဟိတကျောင်း). They fill a void in government services, providing education, health services, housing, and vocational services. One such kyaung, Thabarwa Meditation Center in the Yangon suburb of Thanlyin is one of the largest social welfare centers in Myanmar.

Since 1993, the Ministry of Education and the Ministry of Religious Affairs and Culture have jointly accredited thousands of independent monastic schools to operate in the country. Colloquially called ba ka kyaung (ဘကကျောင်း), these schools are functionally independent but teach the national curriculum, and students from these schools are allowed to sit in state-run examinations. Teacher salaries at these schools are paid by the national government. In 2018, Yangon Region had 280 such schools, attended by 80,000 students, while Mandalay Region had 325 monastic schools (e.g., Phaungdawoo Monastic Education High School), attended by 68,000 students. Many students who attend monastic schools today are from ethnic minorities including the Palaung, Pa'O, and Shan, often fleeing violence and economic insecurity in the country's unstable border regions.

== Statistics ==
In 2016, Mandalay, Ayeyarwady and Bago Regions were home to the most monasteries in Myanmar.

1. Mandalay 9,647 (17.2%)
2. Ayeyarwady 7,762 (13.9%)
3. Bago 7,007 (12.5%)
4. Magwe 6,367 (11.4%)
5. Yangon 5,950 (10.6%)
6. Shan 5,569 (9.95%)
7. Rakine 3,582 (6.40%)
8. Mon 2,890 (5.16%)
9. Sagaing 1,681 (3.00%)
10. Tanintharyi 1,551 (2.77%)
11. Kayin 1,509 (2.70%)
12. Naypyitaw 1,110 (1.98%)
13. Kachin 945 (1.69%)
14. Chin 218 (0.39%)
15. Kayah 200 (0.36%)

Buddhist monasteries in Myanmar are affiliated with a monastic order. However, monks of different orders commonly cross sectarian lines and stay in monasteries of different orders. In 2016, 89% of the country's monasteries were affiliated with Thudhamma Nikaya, the country's largest monastic order.

1. Thudhamma 49,885 (89.1%)
2. Shwegyin 3,554 (6.35%)
3. Mahādvāra 805 (1.44%)
4. Muladvāra 665 (1.19%)
5. Veḷuvan 643 (1.15%)
6. Hngettwin 173 (0.31%)
7. Kuto 133 (0.24%)
8. Mahayin 79 (0.14%)
9. Anaukchaung 51 (0.09%)

== Leadership and ownership ==
A kyaung is an autonomous organization led by an abbot, who oversees daily operations, grants or revokes residence, sets policy on interpreting monastic rules (Vinaya), and guides other resident monks in observing them. Monastic abbots called sayadaw or more precisely kyaung-htaing sayadaw (ကျောင်းထိုင်ဆရာတော်). Monastic abbots are traditionally expected to have been ordained for at least ten years, know all 227 monastic rules (pāṭimokkha), perform rituals according to the Vinaya, and give Dhamma talks. Educational qualifications have increasingly become important - rural abbots need to have passed at least an intermediate-level monastic examination, while urban ones need to have passed advanced-level exam or higher.

In small monasteries, a single abbot manages everything, while larger monasteries have additional leadership roles —such as a vice monk, managing monk, and head of dormitories—who handle specific responsibilities. These roles are appointed by the abbot, and the monks holding such roles are often considered likely successors to him.

Ownership and inheritance of monastic real estate is complicated by the Vinaya. Monastic real estate disputes are adjudicated by religious courts run by the State Sangha Mahā Nāyaka Committee. Forms of monastery ownership include:

- property of an individual or shared monks (puggalika)
- property of the Sangha writ large (cātuddisa saṅghika)
- property of the monastic order
- property of the State Sangha Mahā Nāyaka Committee, typically as guardianship for problematic monasteries
- property of the pagoda trustees
- property of laypeople

== Common kyaung features ==
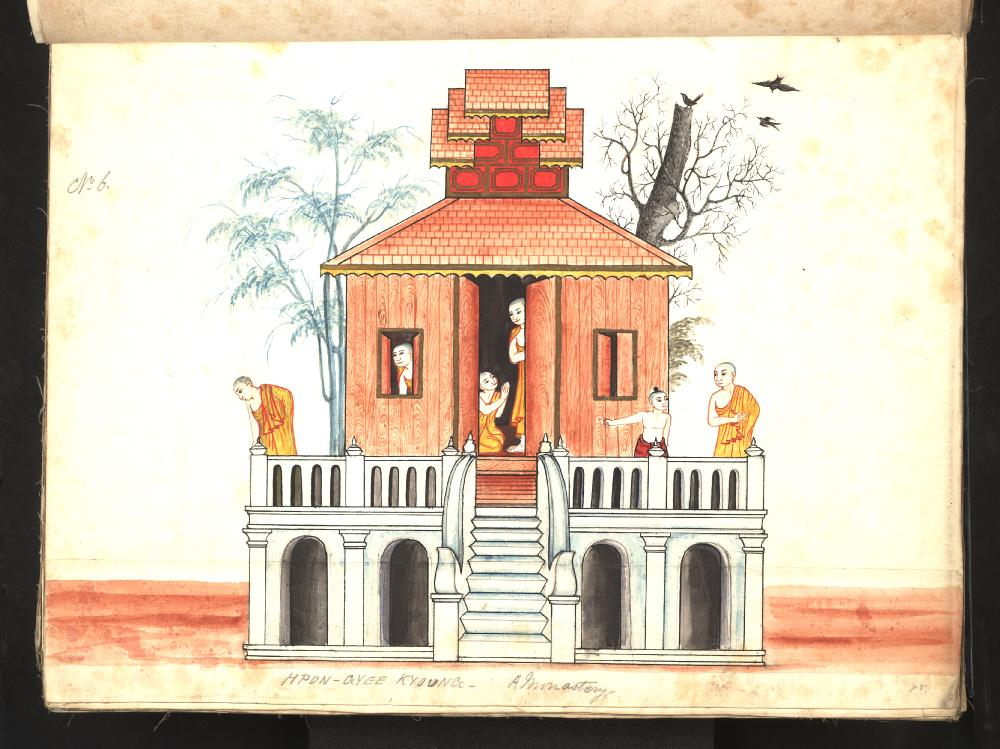
A 19th-century watercolor depicting a kyaung with masonry balustrades.

The typical kyaung consists of a number of buildings called kyaung zaung (ကျောင်းဆောင်):

- Thein (သိမ်, from Pali sīmā) - ordination hall as prescribed by the Vinaya
- Dhammayon (ဓမ္မာရုံ) - assembly hall used for sermons and communal purposes
- Zedi (စေတီ, from Pali cetiya) - stupa, often covered with gold leaf and containing a reliquary
- Gandhakuti (ဂန္ဓကုဋိ, from Pali gandhakuṭi) - pavilion that houses the monastery's principal image of the Buddha
- Shrines to the arhats Sīvali and Shin Upagutta
- Tagundaing - ornamented flagstaff celebrating the submission of local nats (animistic spirits) to the Dhamma
- Zayat - open-air pavilions used as rest houses
- Living quarters for the monks and the sayadaw
- Kyetthayei khan (ကျက်သရေခန်း) - storage room
- Cooking quarters

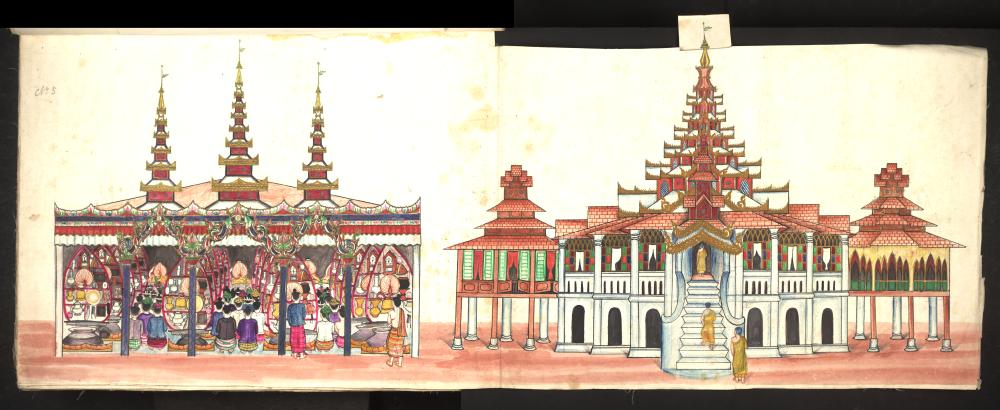
A 19th-century watercolor depicting a more prominent kyaung as indicated by the presence of a multi-tiered pyatthat roof.

Traditional monasteries of the Konbaung era consisted of the following halls:

- Pyatthat hsaung (ပြာသာဒ်ဆောင်) - main chapel hall that housed images of the Buddha
- Hsaungmagyi (ဆောင်မကြီး) or hsaungma (ဆောင်မ) - main assembly hall for lectures, ceremonies and housing junior monks
- Sanu hsaung (စနုဆောင်) - residential hall of the monastery abbot
- Bawga hsaung (ဘောဂဆောင်) - storage room for monks' provisions

In pre-colonial times, royal monasteries were organized as complexes known as kyaung taik (ကျောင်းတိုက်), composed of several residential buildings, including the main building, the kyaunggyi (ကျောင်းကြီး) or kyaungma (ကျောင်းမ), which was occupied by the residing sayadaw, and smaller structures called kyaungyan (ကျောင်းရံ), which housed the sayadaw's disciples. The complexes were walled compounds, and also housed a library, ordination halls, meeting halls, water reservoirs and wells, and utility buildings. Thayettaw is a major kyaungtaik in downtown Yangon, comprising over 60 individual monasteries.

== Examples ==
- Atumashi Monastery
- Bagaya Monastery
- Htilin Monastery
- Mahagandhayon Monastery
- Myadaung Monastery
- Salin Monastery
- Shweinbin Monastery
- Shwenandaw Monastery
- Shwezedi Monastery
- Taiktaw Monastery
- Yaw Mingyi Monastery
- Kongmu Kham, Arunachal Pradesh, India
- Foguang Temple, Yunnan, China
- Dhammikarama Burmese Temple, Penang, Malaysia
- Burmese Buddhist Temple, Singapore

== See also ==
- Gautama Buddha
- Dhamma
- Sangha
- Three Refuges
- Five Precepts
- Eight Precepts
- Four Noble Truths
- Noble Eightfold Path
- Pāli Canon
- Mangala Sutta
- Samatha & Vipassanā
- Cetiya
- Sri Maha Bodhi
- Vassa
- Kathina
- Uposatha
- Shinbyu
- Gadaw
- Shwedagon Pagoda
- Thadingyut Festival
- Pagoda festival
- Pagodas in Myanmar
- Agga Maha Pandita
- State Sangha Maha Nayaka Committee
- List of Sāsana Azani recipients
- International Theravada Buddhist Missionary University
- State Pariyatti Sasana University, Yangon
- State Pariyatti Sasana University, Mandalay
- Buddha Sāsana Nuggaha
- Young Men's Buddhist Association (Burma)
- Vihara
- Wat
