= Foguang Temple (Mangshi) =

Theravadin Buddhist temple in Yunnan, China

- 佛光寺
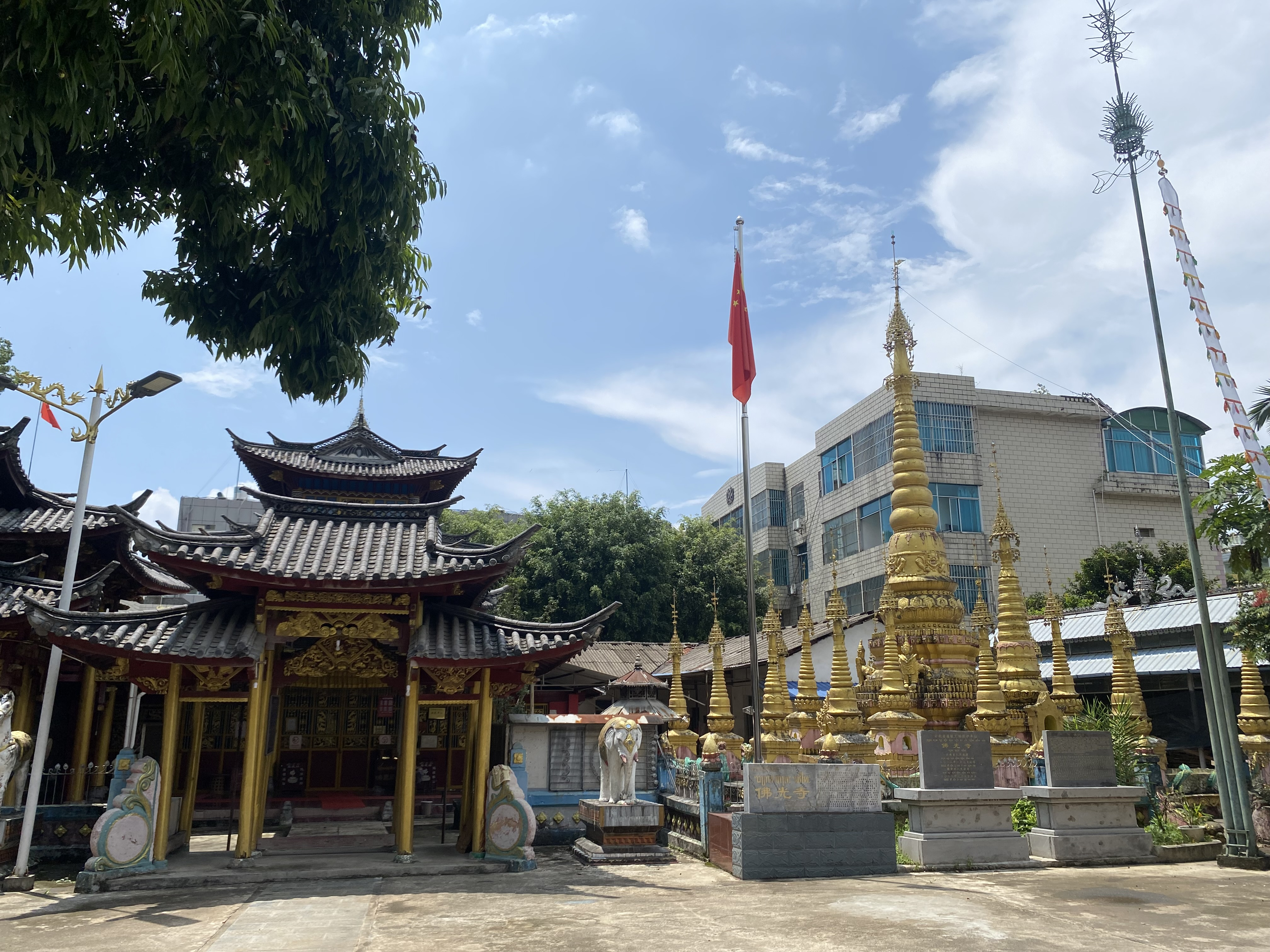

- Location within Yunnan

Religion
- Affiliation: Theravada Buddhism
- Deity: Gautama Buddha

Location
- Location: Mangshi, Yunnan
- Country: China
- Interactive map of Foguang Temple
- Coordinates: 24°26′31″N 98°35′21″E

Architecture
- Style: Chinese architecture - Kyaung
- Founder: Fang Qinglu
- Established: 1873
- Completed: 1983 (reconstruction)

Foguang Temple (Chinese: 佛光寺; pinyin: Fóguāng Sì) is a Theravadin Buddhist temple located in Mangshi, Yunnan, China.

== Name ==
The name of the temple in Dai language is "Zhuang He Xing" (奘贺幸), meaning "a Buddhist temple holds the first Buddhist texts".

== History ==
The temple was originally built in 1873, during the region of Tongzhi Emperor (1862–1874) of the Qing dynasty (1644–1911). It used to be the palace of Fang Qinglu (放庆禄), who was the 20th Tusi. Towards the completion of the project, someone reported to the Qing government that the building had violated regulations, and Fang Qinglu had to change it into a Buddhist temple.

The temple was slightly damaged during the Second Sino-Japanese War. In the Cultural Revolution, most of its buildings were completely destroyed by the Red Guards, only the Main Hall and South Hall survived. After the 3rd Plenary Session of the 11th Central Committee of the Chinese Communist Party, the policy of some religious freedom was implemented. Foguang Temple was renovated and restored in 1983.

== Architecture ==
The Main Hall is the most important hall in the temple, it has a double-eave gable and hip roofs. The statue of Gautama Buddha is enshrined in the hall.

== Gallery ==
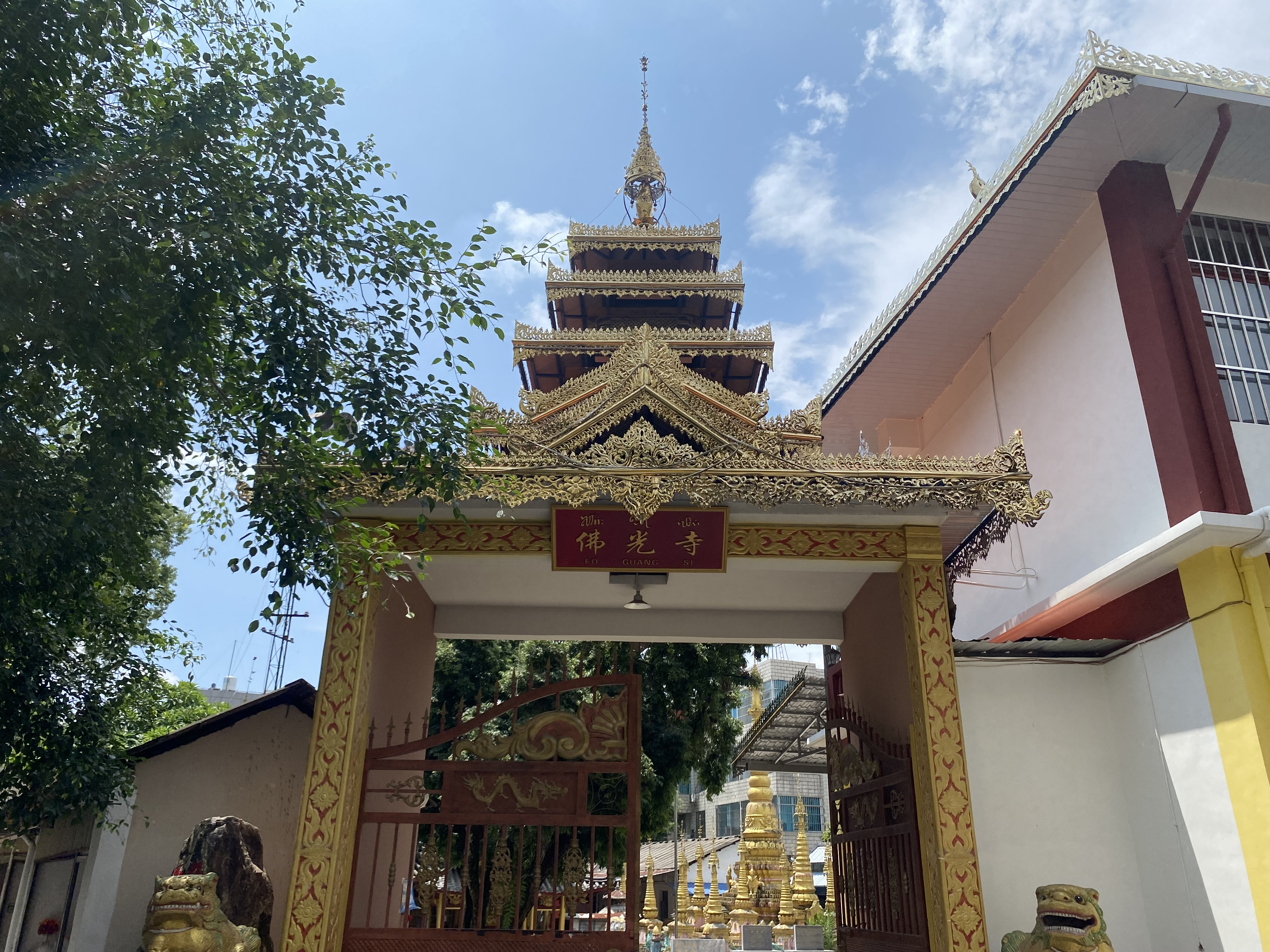
Foguang Temple Entrance

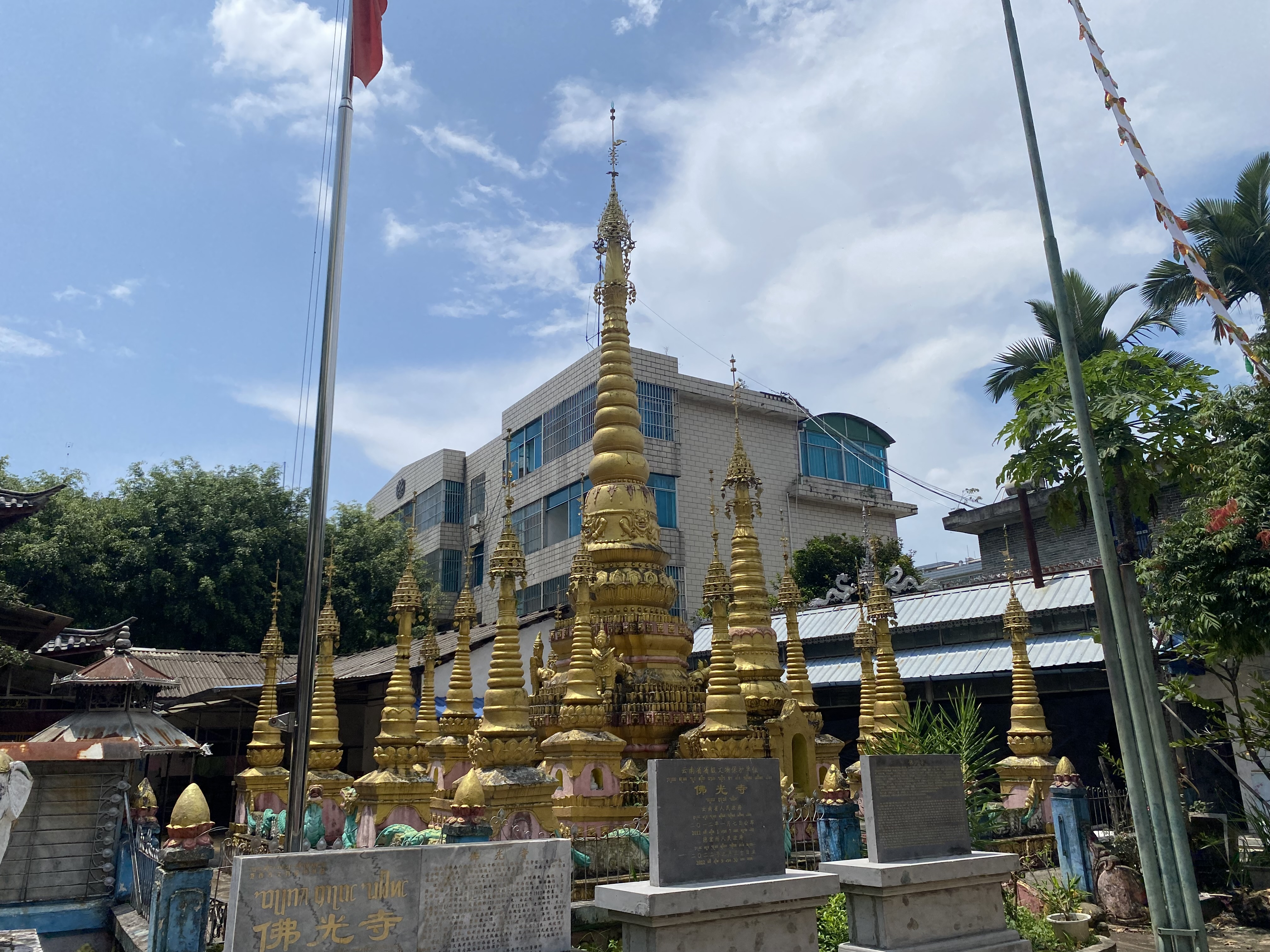
Foguang Temple Pagoda
