= Myadaung Monastery =

Buddhist monastery in Mandalay, Myanmar

- မြတောင်ကျောင်း
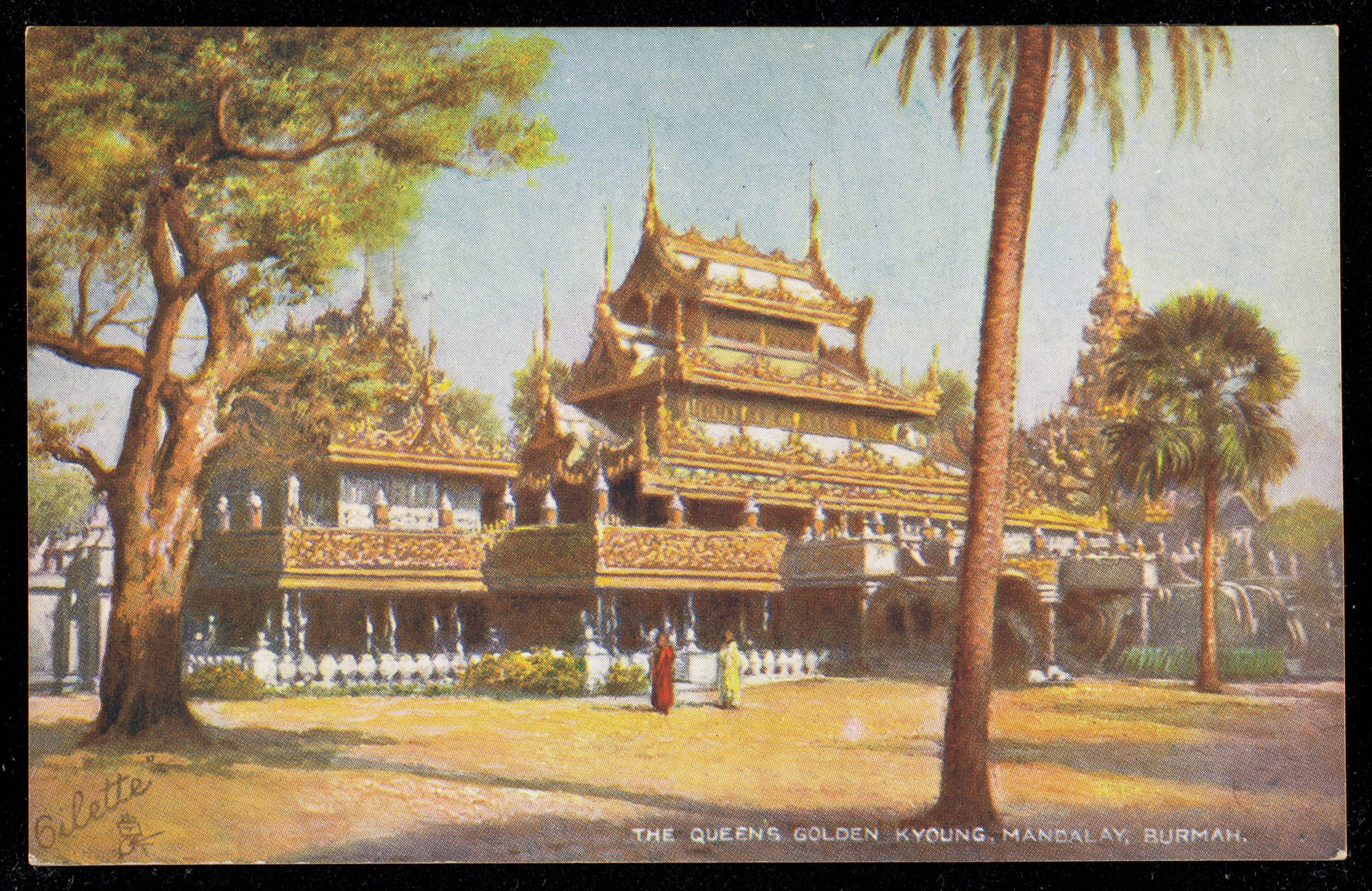

Religion
- Affiliation: Theravada Buddhism

Location
- Country: Mandalay, Mandalay Region, Burma

Architecture
- Founder: Queen Supayalat
- Completed: 1885; 141 years ago

Myadaung Monastery (Burmese: မြတောင်ကျောင်း; also known as the Queen's Monastery) was a Buddhist monastery built in 1885 under the patronage of Queen Supayalat. Myadaung Monastery was located 1 mile (1.6 km) southwest of Mandalay Palace, and was profusely carved and gilded in gold. As a fine specimen of Burmese architecture, its conservation was ordered by Lord Curzon in December 1901. The Monastery was destroyed during the second World War.

== See also ==
- Atumashi Monastery
- Shwenandaw Monastery
- Taiktaw Monastery
- Salin Monastery
- Yaw Mingyi Monastery
