= Taiktaw Monastery =

Royal Buddhist monastery in Mandalay, Myanmar

- တိုက်တော်ကျောင်း
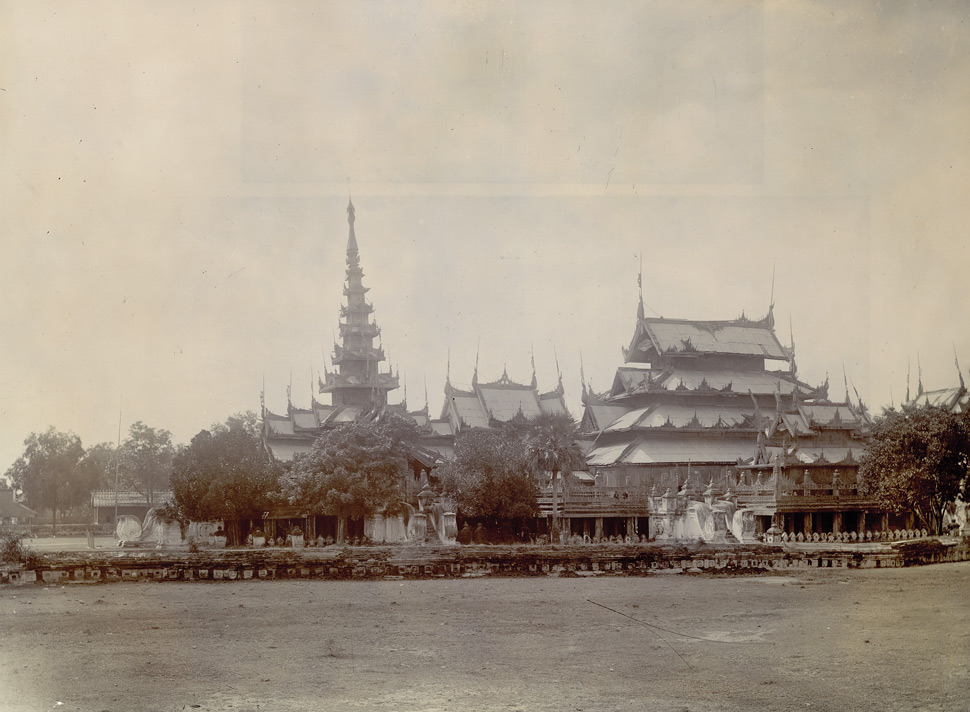

Religion
- Affiliation: Theravada Buddhism

Location
- Country: Mandalay, Mandalay Region, Burma
- Interactive map of Taiktaw Monastery
- Coordinates: 21.993230°N 96.108208°E

Architecture
- Founder: King Mindon Min
- Completed: 1859; 167 years ago

Taiktaw Monastery (Burmese: တိုက်တော်ကျောင်း) is a royal Buddhist monastery in Mandalay, Burma, known for its bold wooden carvings. The central building was the residence of the Thathanabaing, and the posts were taken from the Amarapura Palace. It was built by King Mindon Min in 1859, and was used under the Burmese monarchy as the official residence of the Thathanabaing.

Taiktaw Monastery was located close to the eastern gate into Mandalay Palace.

== See also ==
- Kyaung
- Atumashi Monastery
- Shwenandaw Monastery
- Myadaung Monastery
- Salin Monastery
