= Thayettaw Monastery =

Buddhist monastic complex in Yangon, Myanmar

Coordinates: 16.778780°N 96.14636°E

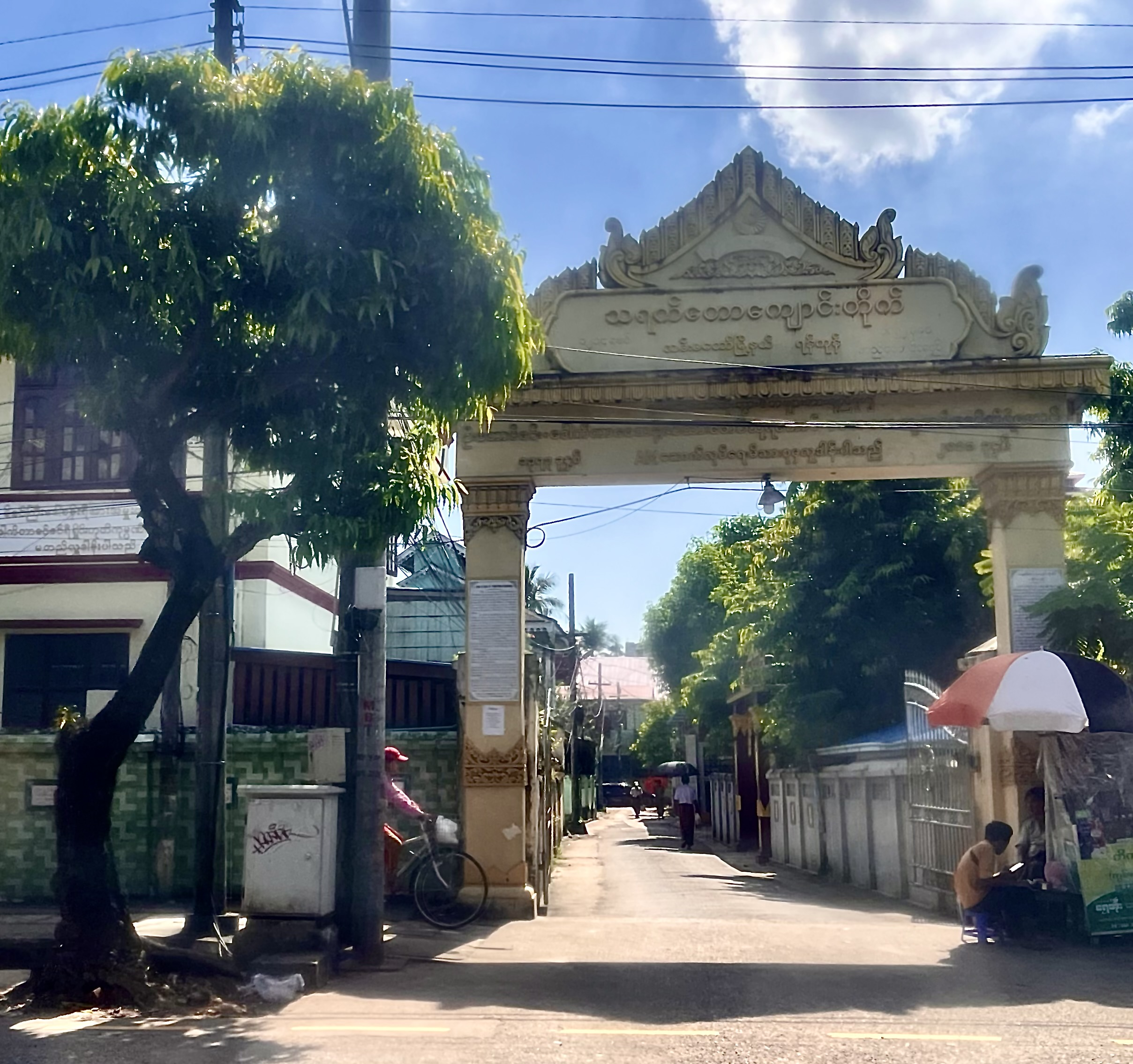
- Interactive map of Thayettaw Monastery

Monastery information
- Other names: Thayettaw Kyaungtaik
- Denomination: Buddhism (Theravada)
- Established: Konbaung dynasty (founded by Dagon mayor U Shangalay and royal messenger Maung Tu)

People
- Founders: U Shangalay and Maung Tu

Site
- Location: 9th Ward, Lanmadaw Township, Yangon, Myanmar
- Country: Myanmar

Thayettaw (Burmese: သရက်တောကျောင်းတိုက်, also spelt Thayettaw Kyaungtaik) is a complex of over 60 Buddhist monasteries (kyaung) in Yangon, Myanmar (formerly Rangoon, Burma), located in Lanmadaw Township's 9th ward, immediately north of Yangon Chinatown. The monastery occupies a sprawling plot that is bounded by Bogyoke Aung San Road to the north, Anawrahta Road to the south, Phongyi Street to the west, and Myoma School Street to the west.

The complex faces Yangon General Hospital and University of Medicine 1, Yangon, the former of which is the largest public hospital in the country. Owing to its proximity to these medical facilities, Thayettaw monasteries also provide de facto social safety net services (housing, meals, etc.) for impoverished patients seeking treatment in the city. The patients generally come from other parts of Lower Myanmar, namely Ayeyarwady Region, Bago Region, Mon State, and Kayin State.

== History ==
The Thayettaw monastic complex was established on a mango grove on the outskirts of pre-colonial Rangoon, hence the name thayet taw (lit. 'mango grove'). Stone inscriptions indicate that the complex was founded during the Konbaung dynasty by Dagon mayor U Shangalay and royal messenger and port-officer Maung Tu, who built and donated a monastery to Sayadaw U Mani of Inwa, during the reign of King Tharrawaddy Min. On 11 March 1854, Queen Victoria issued a royal decree that conferred the complex religious freehold title.

As colonial authorities demolished the pre-colonial town of Dagon in favor of a city grid, authorities evicted many monasteries scattered throughout the town, especially around Sule Pagoda; consequently, under the orders of Arthur Phayre, Thayettaw became the site of all the town's displaced Buddhist monasteries. By 1900, Thayettaw housed more than 50 monasteries and zayat (rest houses).

== See also ==
- Buddhism in Myanmar
- Kyaung
