= Salin Monastery =

Buddhist monastery in Mandalay, Myanmar

- စလင်းကျောင်း
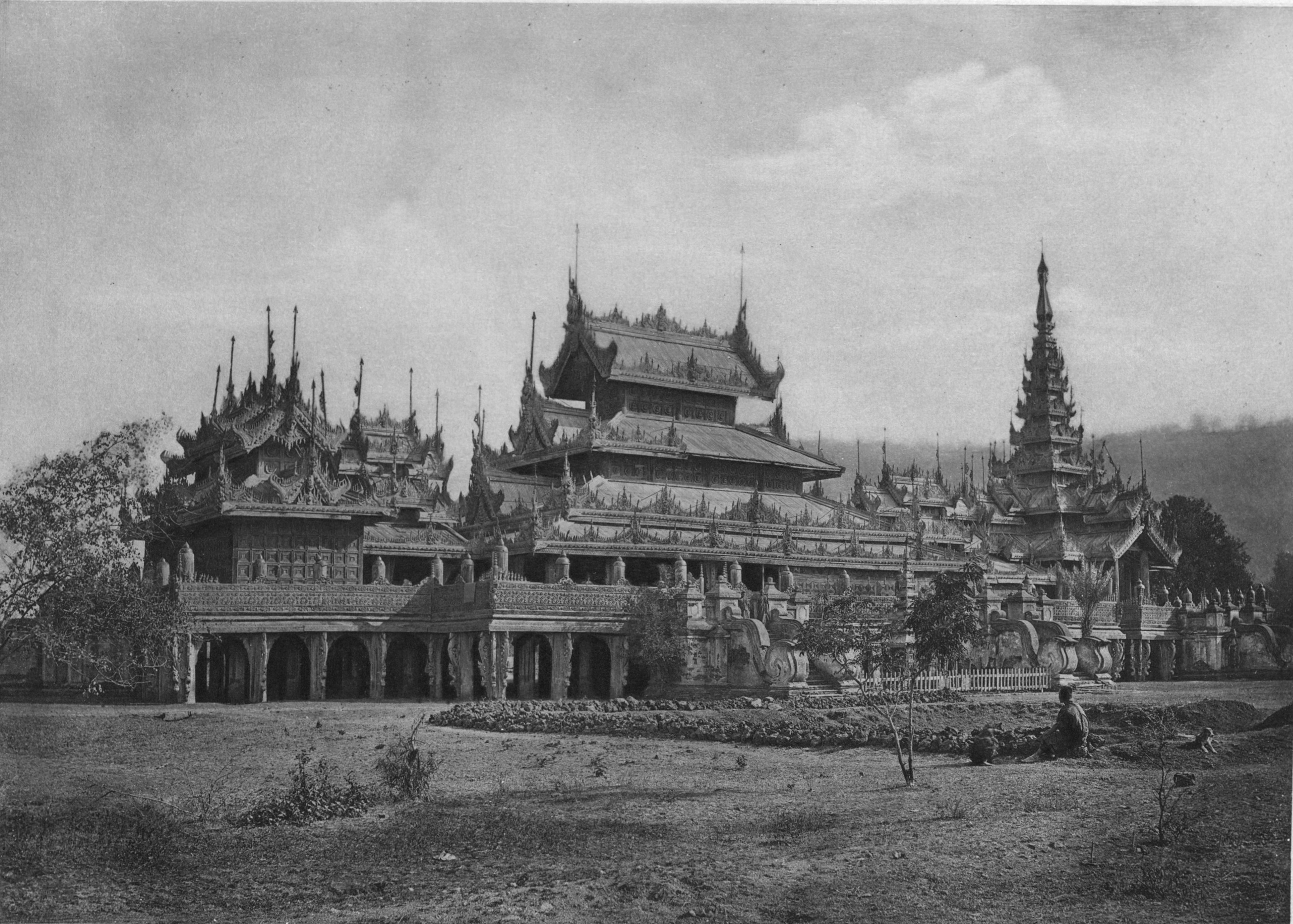
- Salin Monastery in 1903

- Location within Myanmar

Religion
- Affiliation: Theravada Buddhism

Location
- Country: Mandalay, Mandalay Region, Burma
- Interactive map of Salin Monastery
- Coordinates: 22.00847253720409°N 96.10135158482969°E

Architecture
- Founder: Salin Supaya
- Completed: 1876; 150 years ago

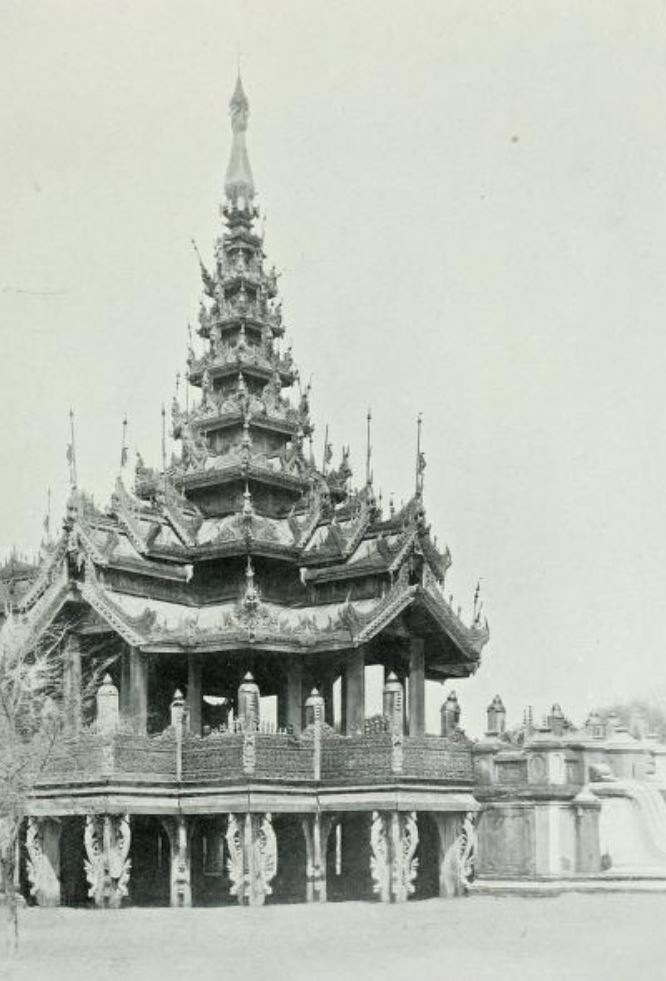
Salin Monastery

Salin Monastery (Burmese: စလင်းကျောင်း) is a royal Buddhist monastery in Mandalay, Burma, known for its indigenous wooden carvings. The monastery was built under the patronage of the crown princess Salin Supaya. Salin Monastery was located north of Mandalay Palace, near the racetrack.

== See also ==
- Atumashi Monastery
- Shwenandaw Monastery
- Myadaung Monastery
- Taiktaw Monastery
