= Pyatthat =

Multistaged Burmese roof with odd number of tiers

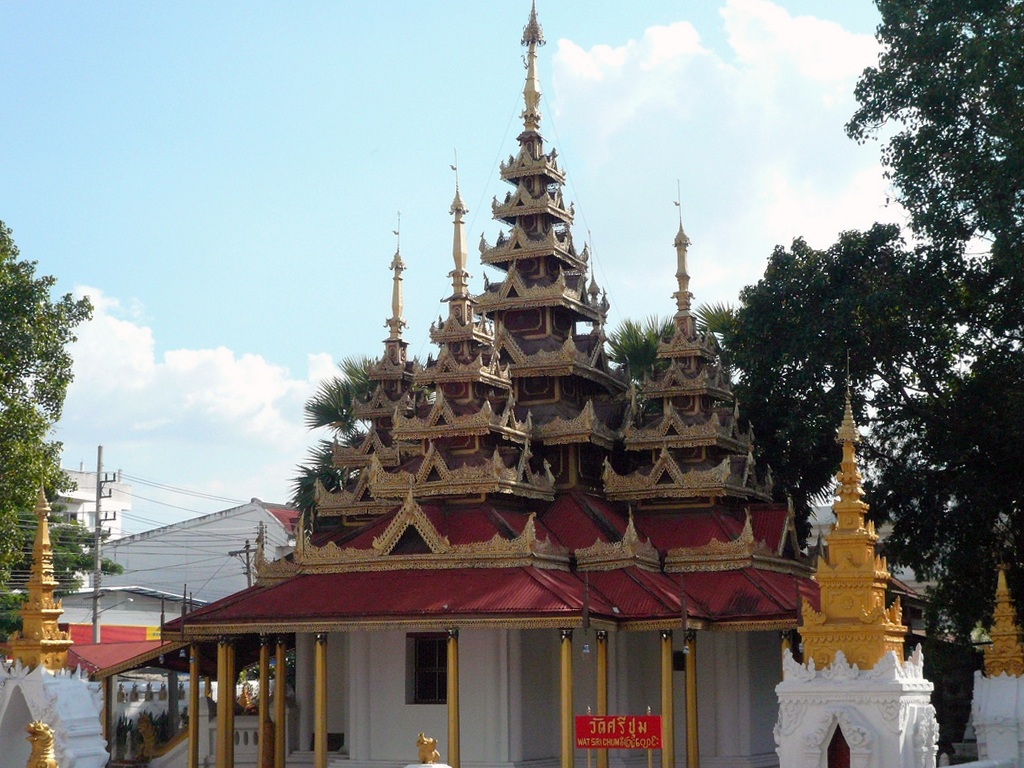
An example of a pyathat-roofed building at Wat Srichum in Lampang, Thailand

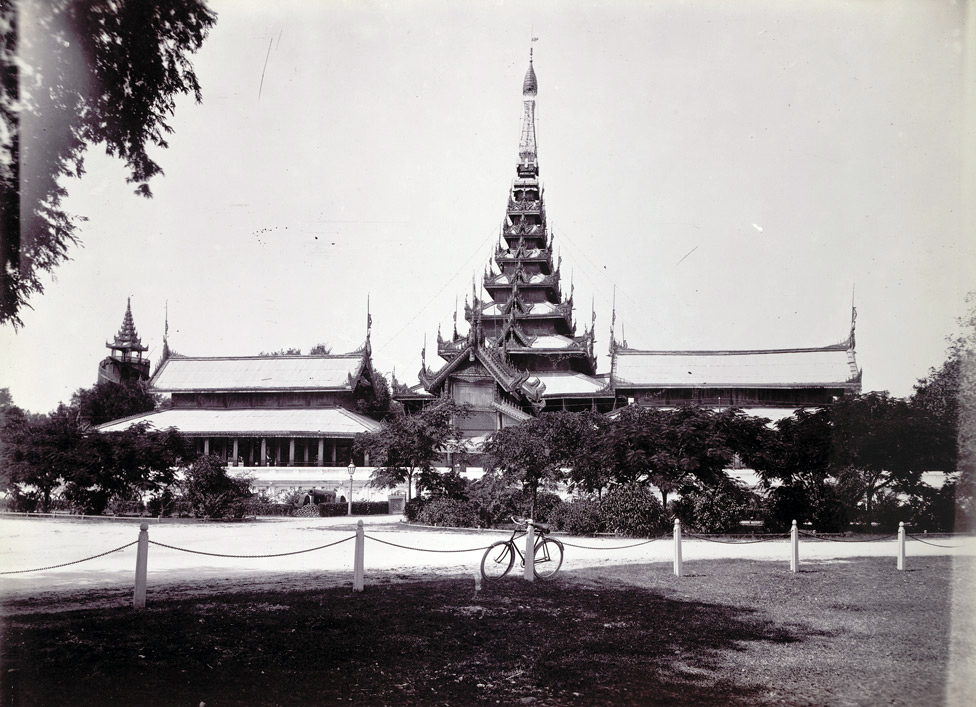
The Mandalay Palace's Great Audience Hall features a prominent seven-tiered pyatthat.

Pyatthat (Burmese: ပြာသာဒ်, IPA: [pjaʔθaʔ]; from Sanskrit prāsāda; Mon: တန်ဆံၚ် IPA: [tan.cʰi̤ŋ]; also spelt pyathat) is the name of a multistaged roof, with an odd number of tiers (from three to seven). The pyatthat is commonly incorporated into Burmese Buddhist and royal architecture (e.g., kyaungs, palace buildings, pagodas) and towers above the image of the Buddha or other sacred places (e.g., royal thrones and city gates).

== Construction ==
The pyatthat is made of successive gabled rectangular roofs in an exaggerated pyramidal shape, with an intervening box-like structure called the lebaw (လည်ပေါ်) between each roof. The pyatthat is crowned with a wooden spire called the taing bu (တိုင်ဖူး) or kun bu (ကွန်းဖူး) depending on its shape, similar to the hti, an umbrella ornament that crowns Burmese pagodas. The edges of each tier are gold-gilded decorative designs made of metal sheet, with decorative ornaments called du yin (တုရင်) at the corners (analogous to the Thai chofah). There are three primary kinds of pyatthat, with the variation being the number of tiers called boun (ဘုံ, from Pali bhumi). Three-tiered, five-tiered and seven-tiered roofs are called yahma, thooba, and thooyahma, respectively.

== History ==
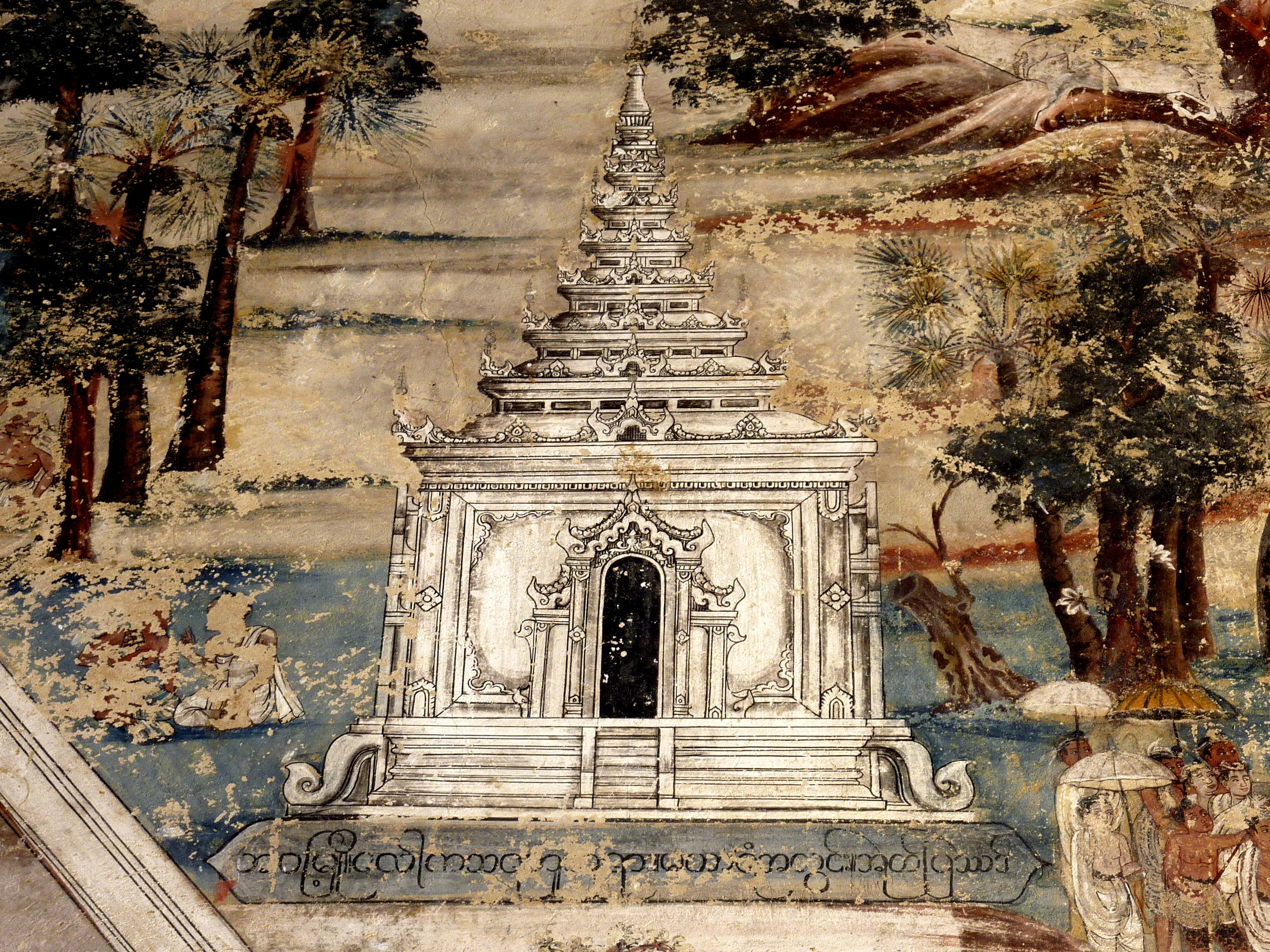
A mural scene depicting a brick pyatthat roofed structure in Inwa.

The usage of the pyatthat began early in Burmese architecture, with examples dating to the Pagan period. Prominent examples from this era that feature the pyatthat include the Ananda Temple and Gawdawpalin Temple

In pre-colonial Burma, the pyatthat was a prominent feature in the royal buildings, which itself symbolized Tavatimsa, a Buddhist heaven. Above the main throne in the king's primary audience hall was a nine-tiered pyatthat, with the tip representing Mount Meru (မြင်းမိုရ်) and the lower six tiers representing the six abodes of the devas and of humans. Furthermore, the 12 city gates of Burmese royal capitals were crowned with pyatthats, with the main ones used by royalty possessing five tiers, and the others possessing five tiers.

In pre-colonial Burma, sumptuary laws restricted the usage of pyatthats to royal and religious buildings, and regulated the number of tiers appertaining to each grade of official rank, The nine-tiered pyatthat was reserved solely for the kingdom's sovereign, while the sawbwas of important tributary states were entitled to seven-tiered pyatthats.

== Gallery ==
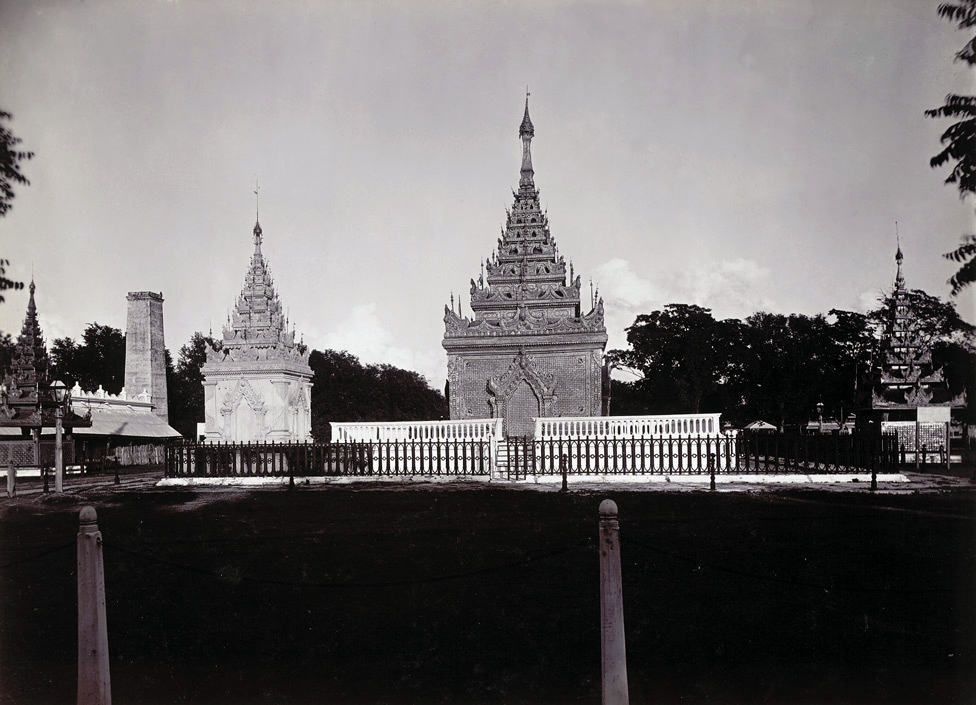
King Mindon's Tomb, Mandalay

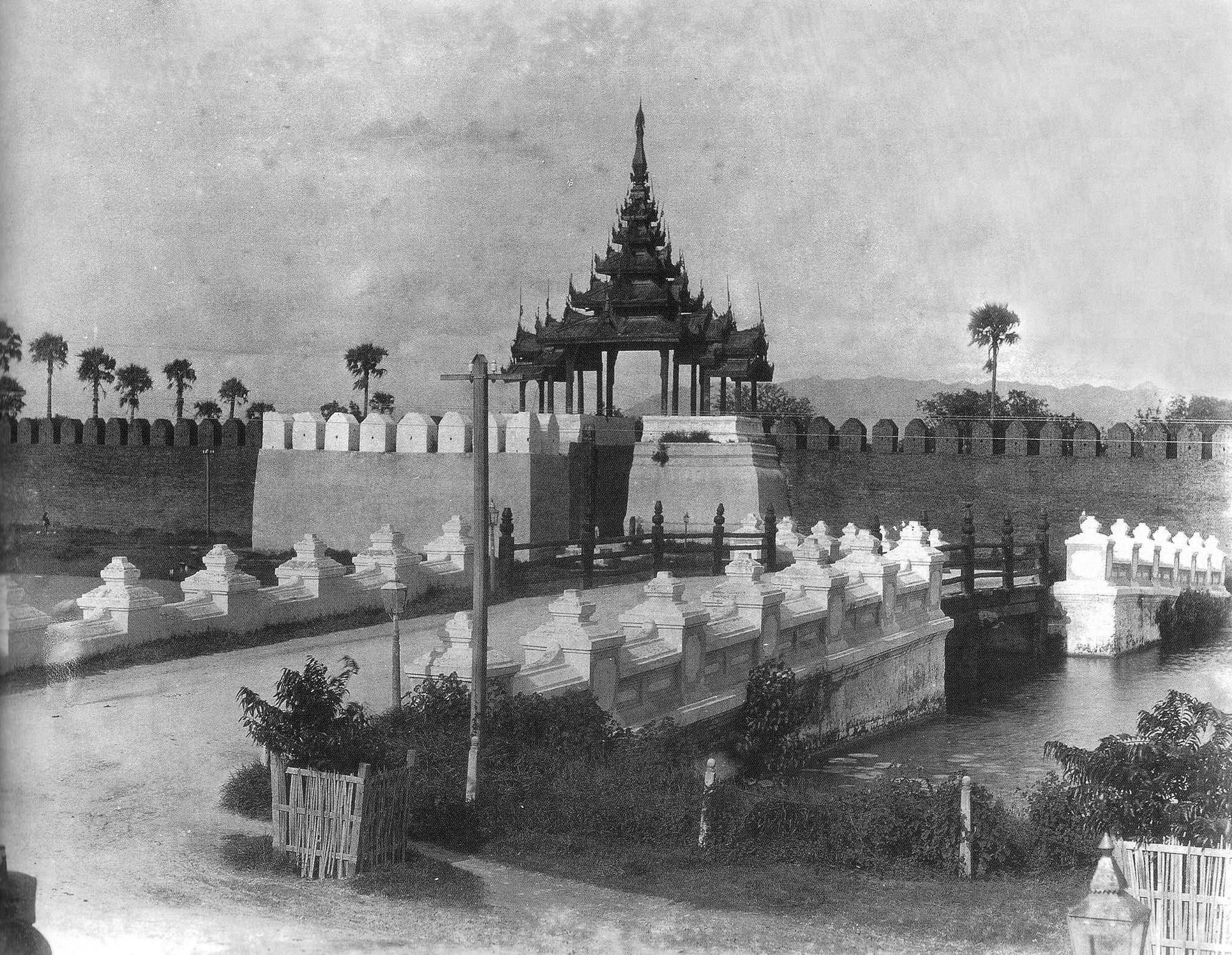
Mandalay Palace entrance

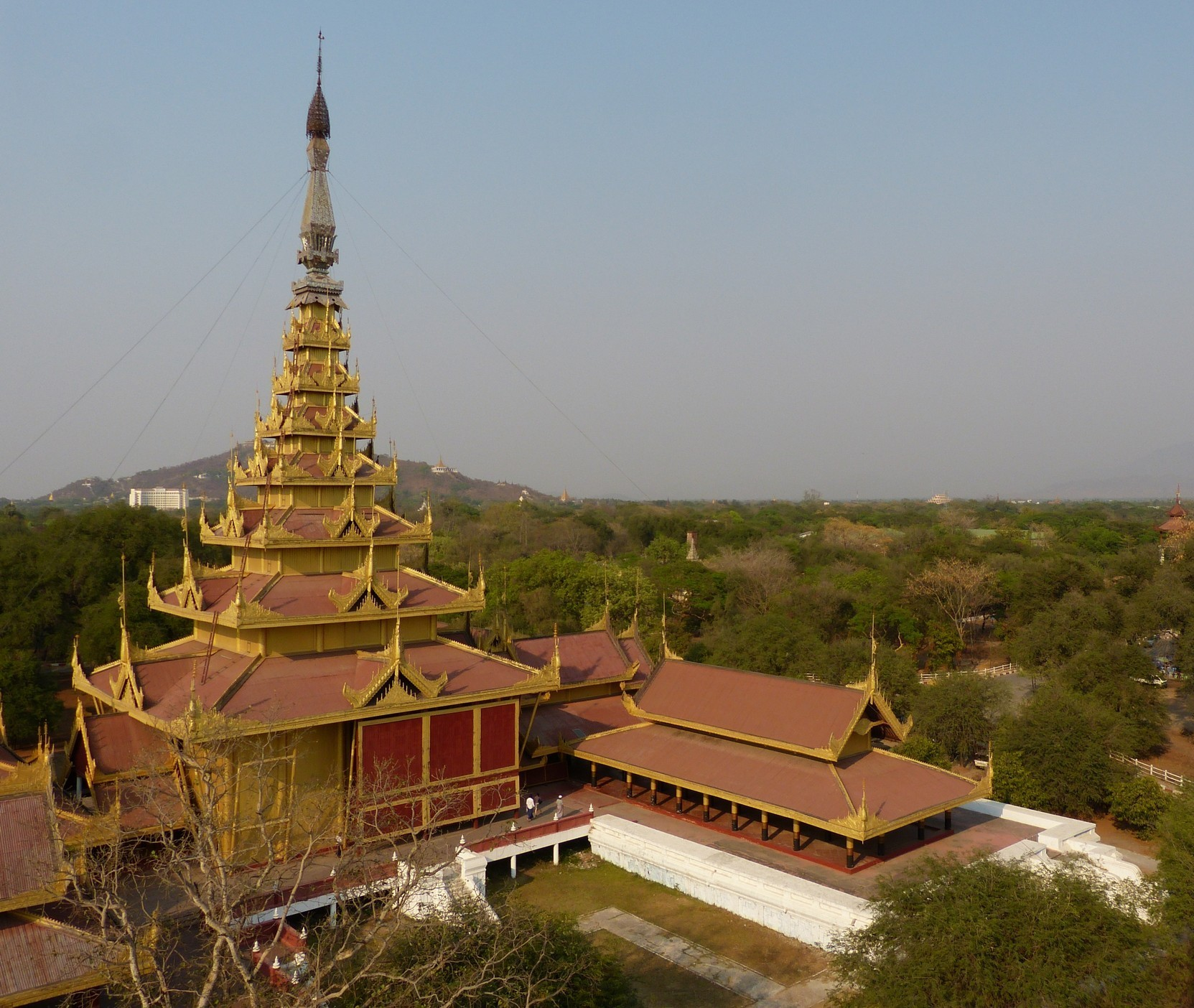
Mandalay palace

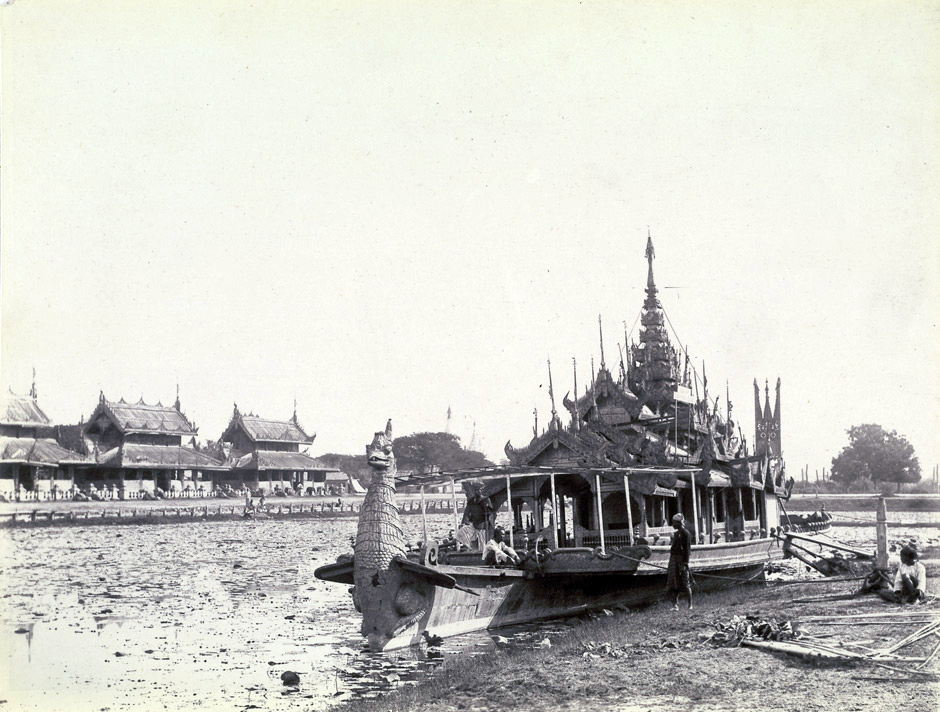
King Thibaw's State Barge on the Mandalay Moat

== See also ==
- Prasat (Thai architecture)
- Prang (architecture)
- Meru tower
- Kyaung
