= Shwenandaw Monastery =

Buddhist monastery in Myanmar

- ရွှေနန်းတော်ကျောင်း
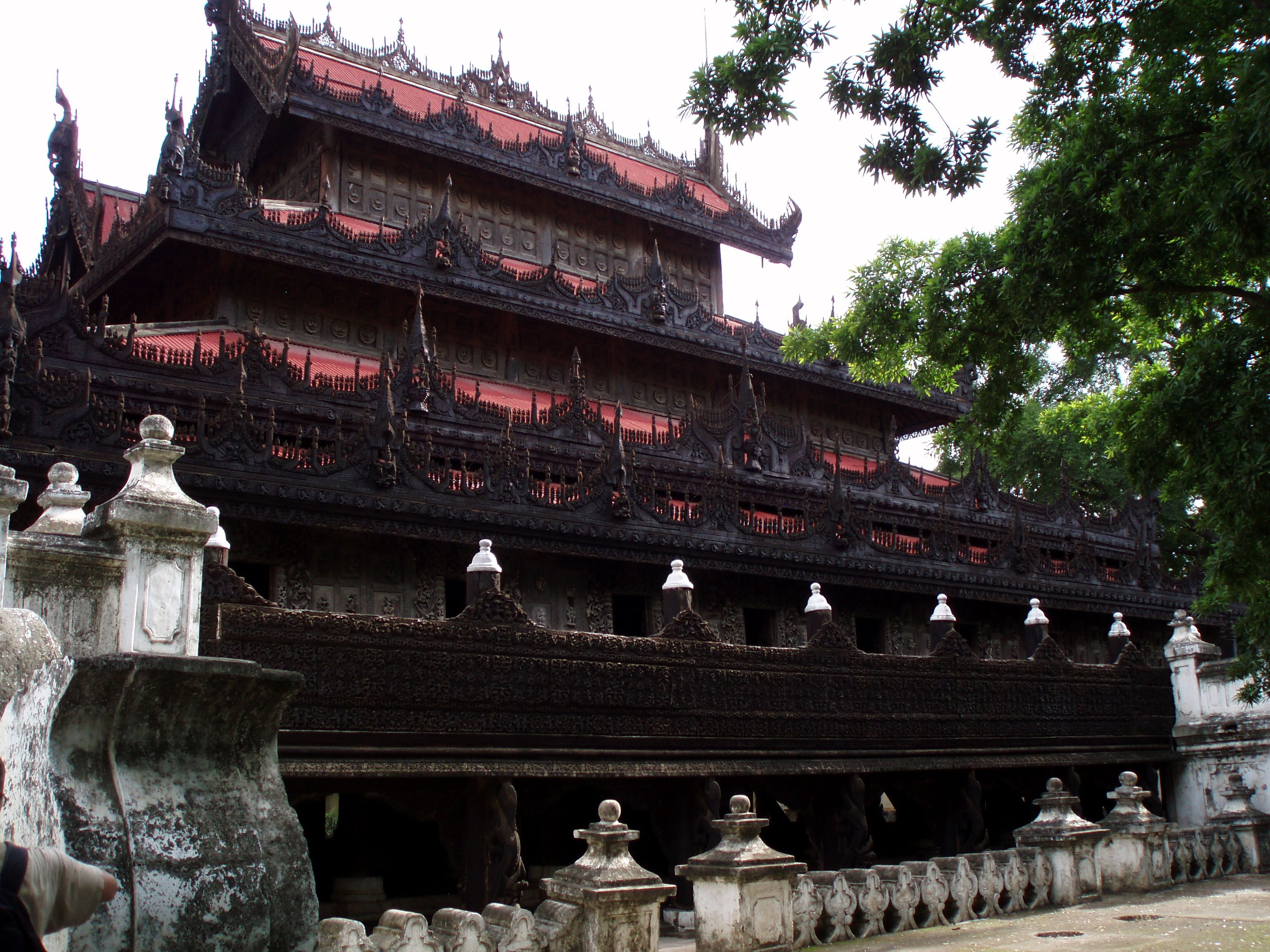

- Location within Myanmar

Religion
- Affiliation: Theravada Buddhism

Location
- Country: Mandalay, Mandalay Region, Burma
- Coordinates: 22°0′2.43″N 96°6′49.40″E

Architecture
- Founder: King Thibaw Min
- Completed: 1880 (146 years ago)

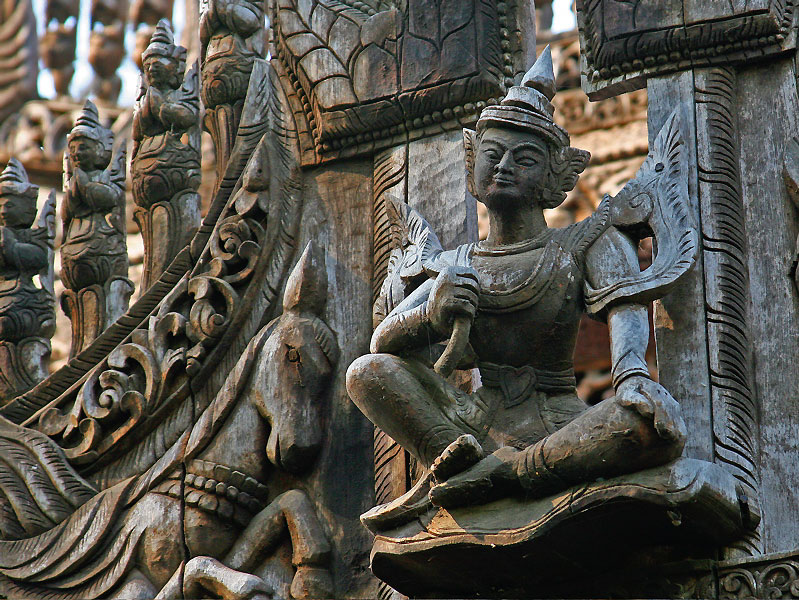
Wood carving of Lawka Nat at Shwenandaw Monastery

Shwenandaw Monastery (Burmese: ရွှေနန်းတော်ကျောင်း, MLCTS: hrwe. nan: taw kyaung:, IPA: [ʃwènáɰ̃dɔ̀ tʃáuɰ̃]; lit. "Golden Palace Monastery") is a historic Buddhist monastery located near Mandalay Hill, Mandalay Region, Myanmar (formerly Burma).

Shwenandaw Monastery was built in 1878 by King Thibaw Min, who dismantled and relocated the apartment formerly occupied by his father, King Mindon Min, just before Mindon Min's death, at a cost of 120,000 rupees. Thibaw removed the building on 10 October 1878, believing it to be haunted by his father's spirit. The building reconstruction was finished in 31 Oct 1878, dedicated in memory of his father, on a plot adjoining Atumashi Monastery.It is said that King Thibaw used it for meditation, and the meditation couch he sat on can still be seen.

The building was originally part of the royal palace at Amarapura, before it was moved to Mandalay, where it formed the northern section of the Hmannan (Glass Palace) and part of the king's royal apartments. The building was heavily gilt with gold and adorned with glass mosaic work.

The monastery is known for its teak carvings of Buddhist myths, which adorn its walls and roofs. The monastery is built in the traditional Burmese architectural style. Shwenandaw Monastery is the single remaining major original structure of the original Royal Palace today.

== Gallery ==
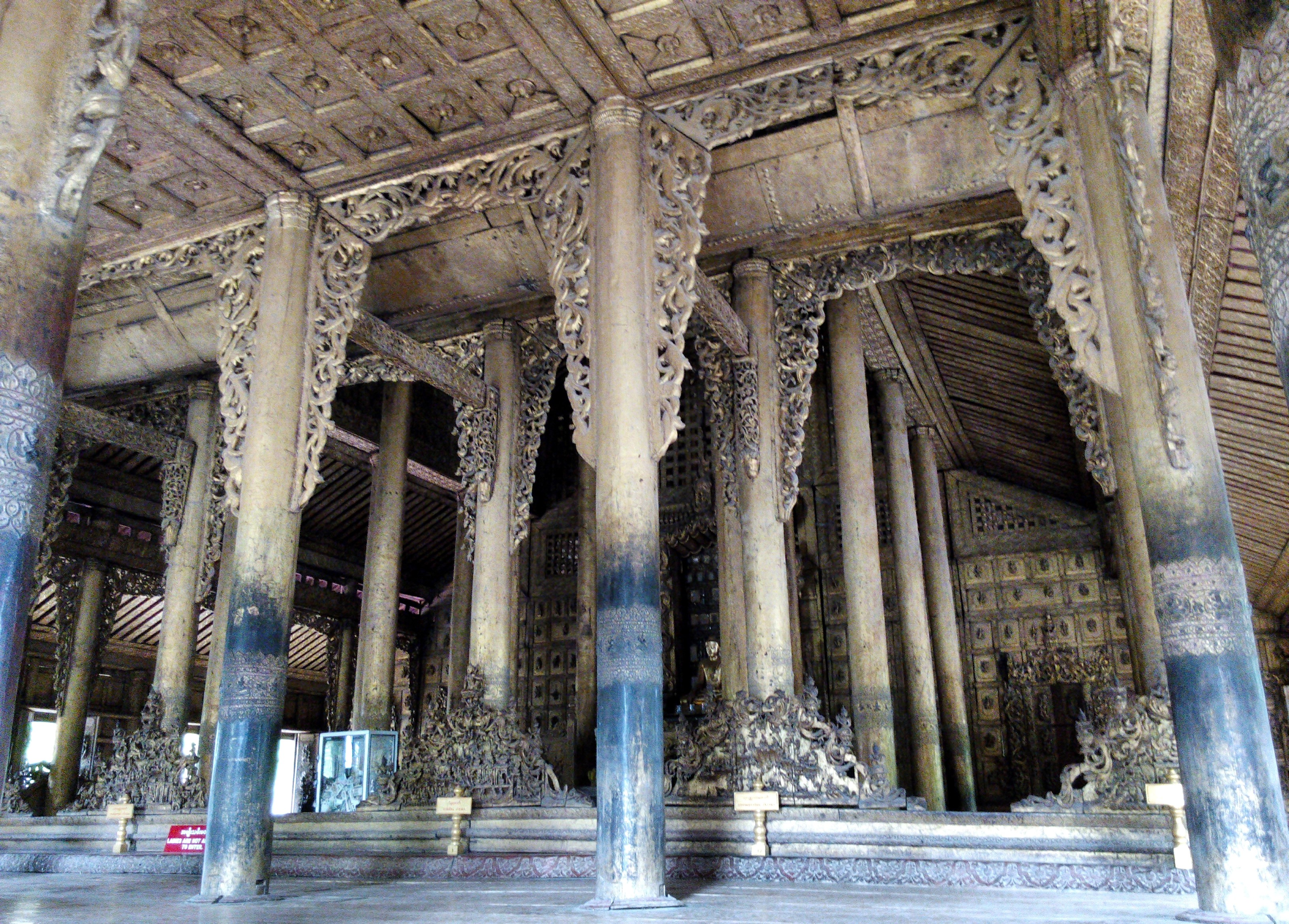

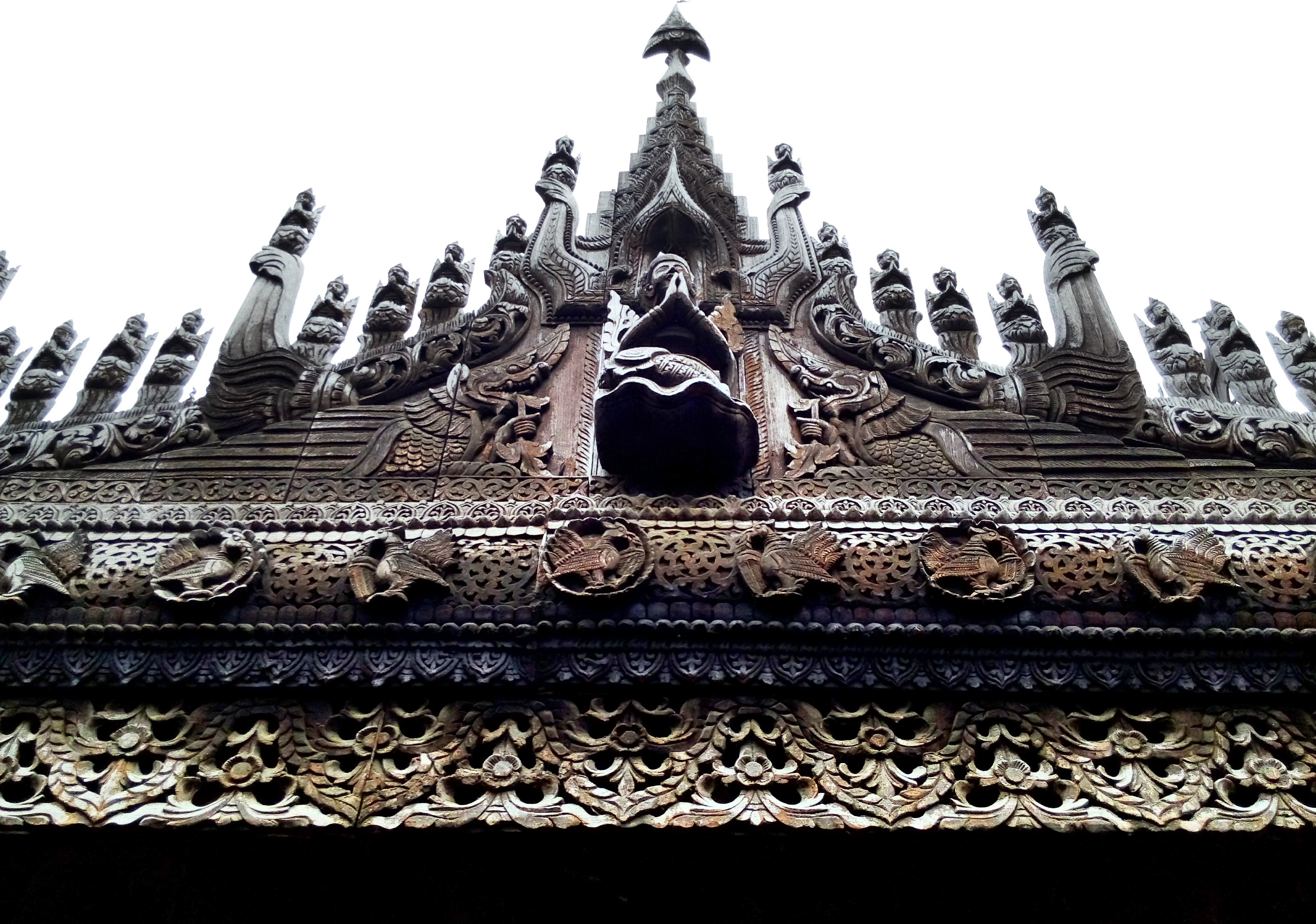

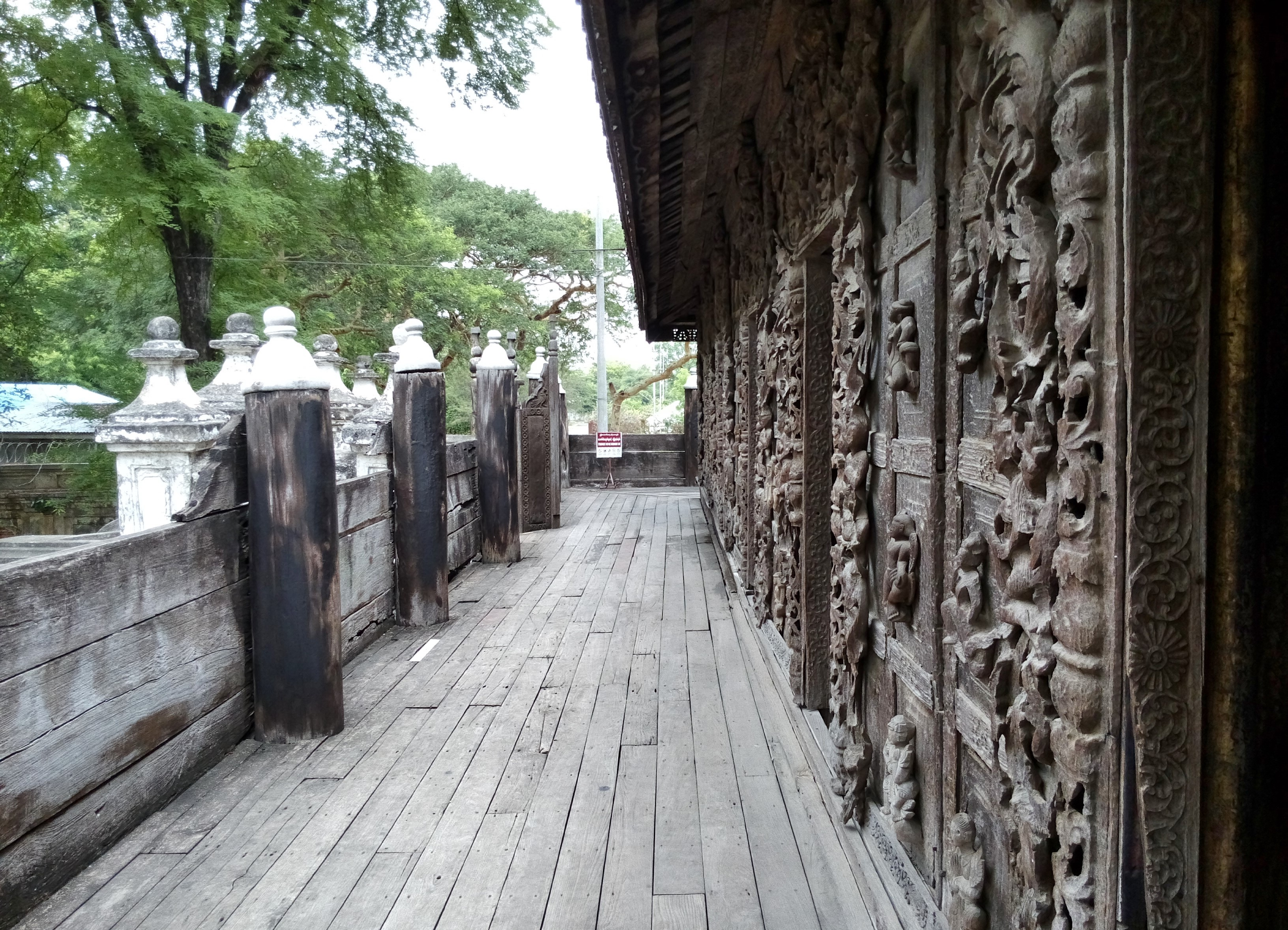

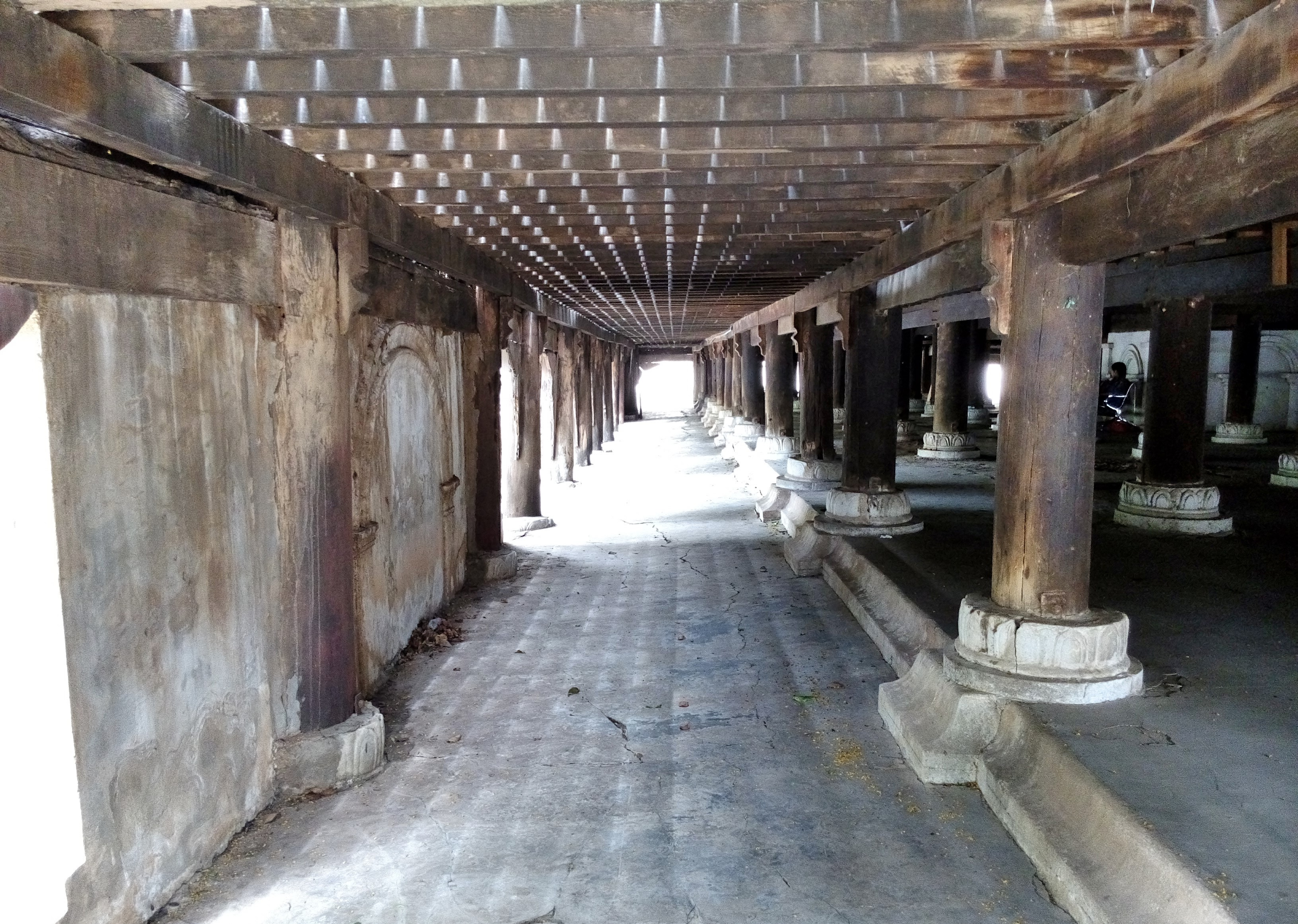

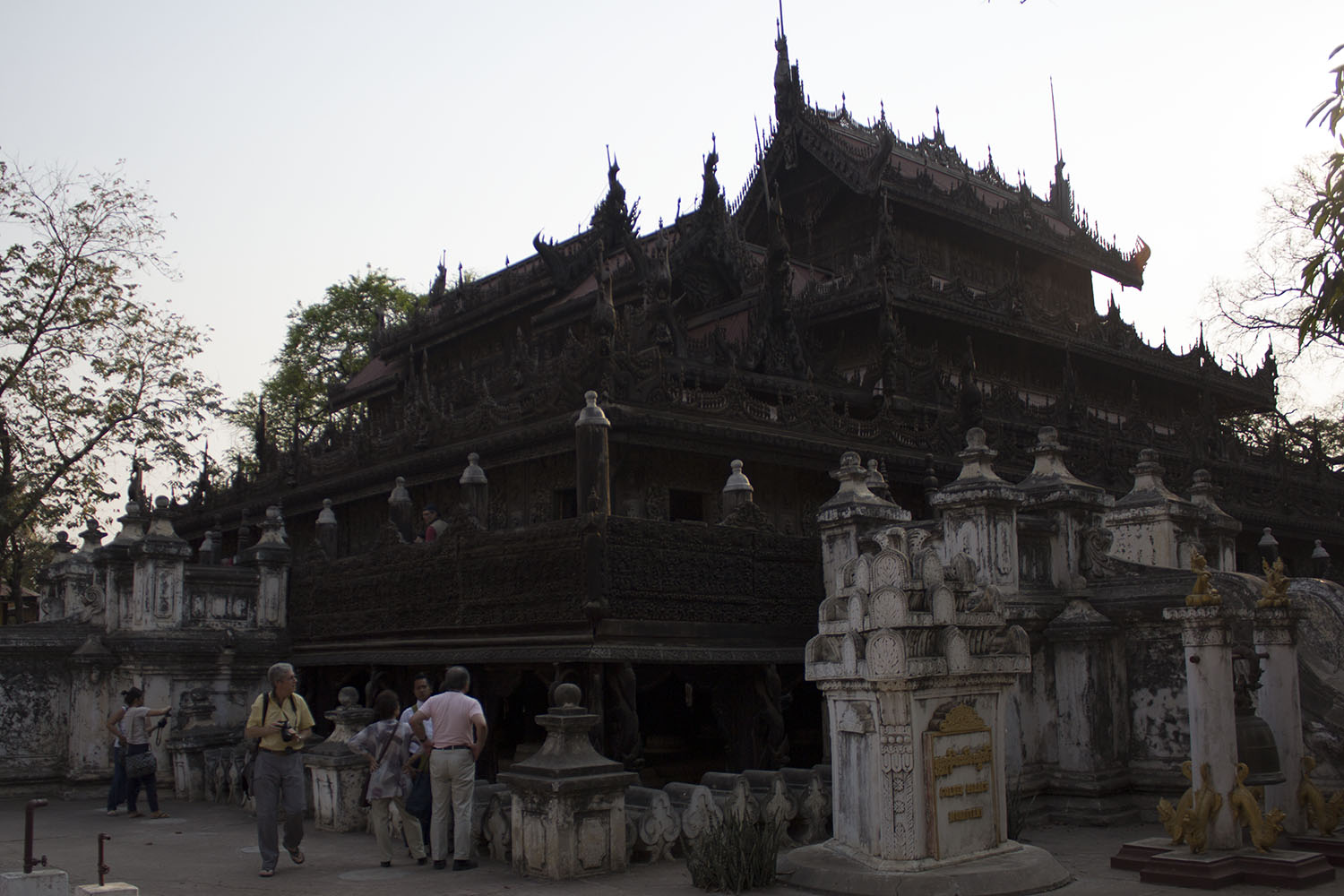

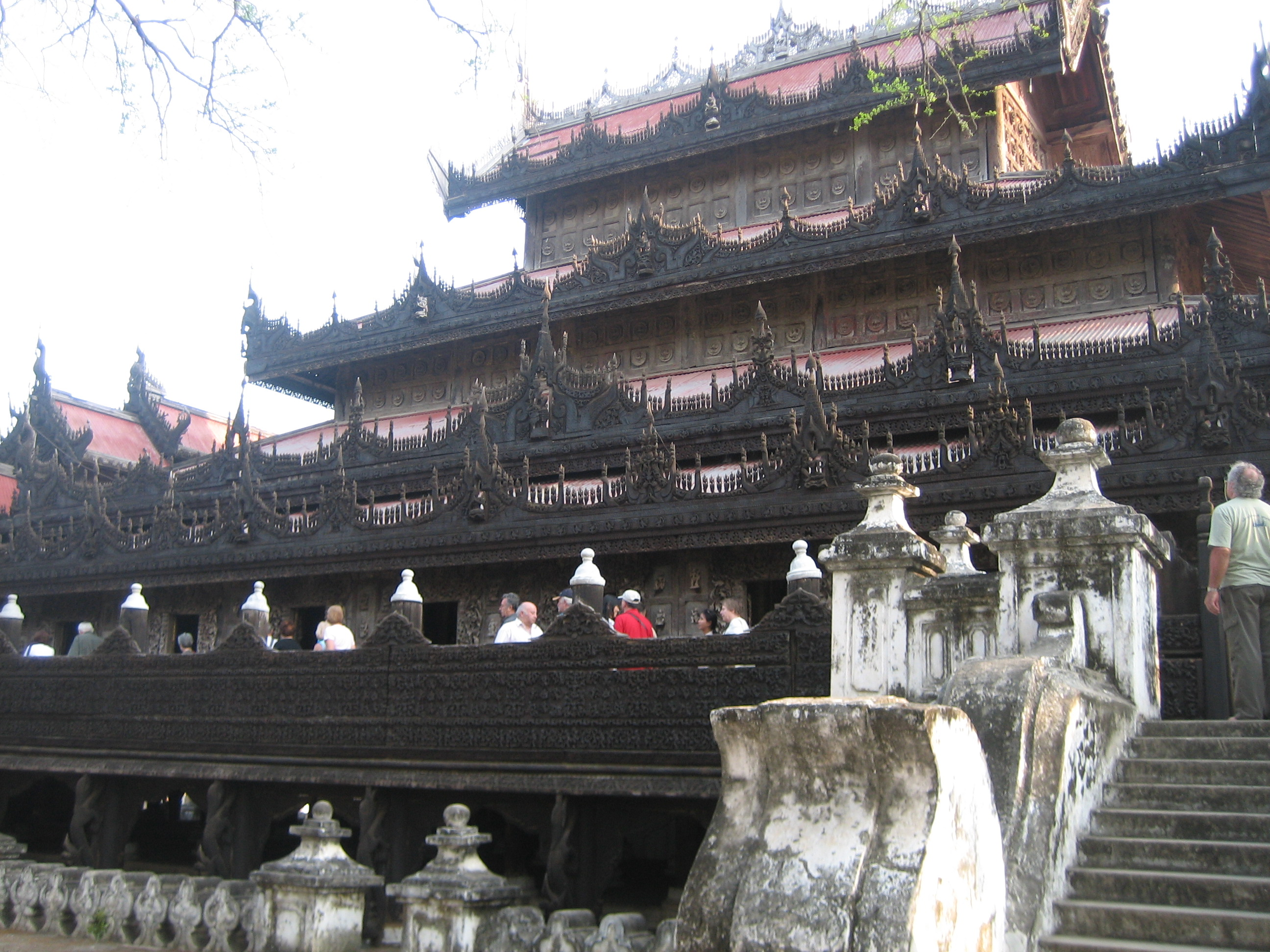

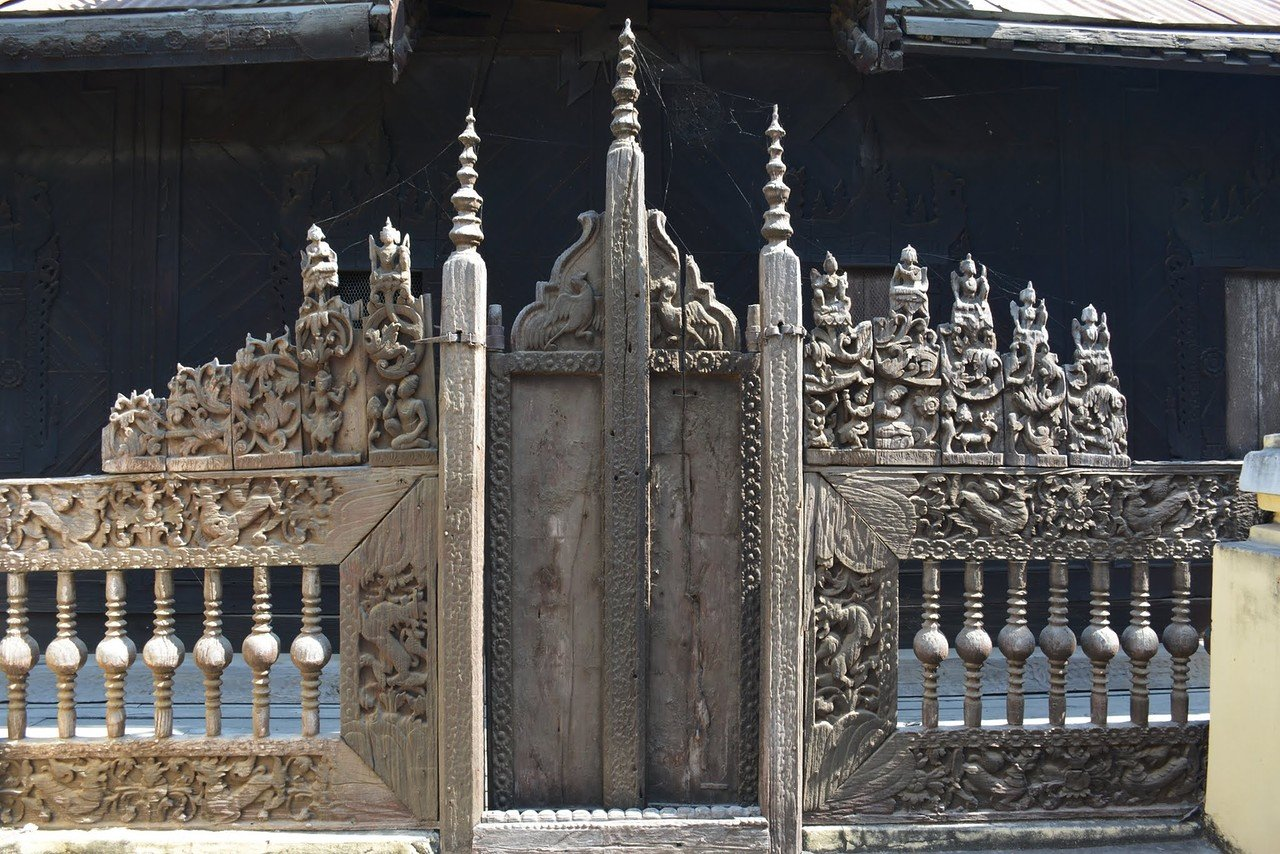

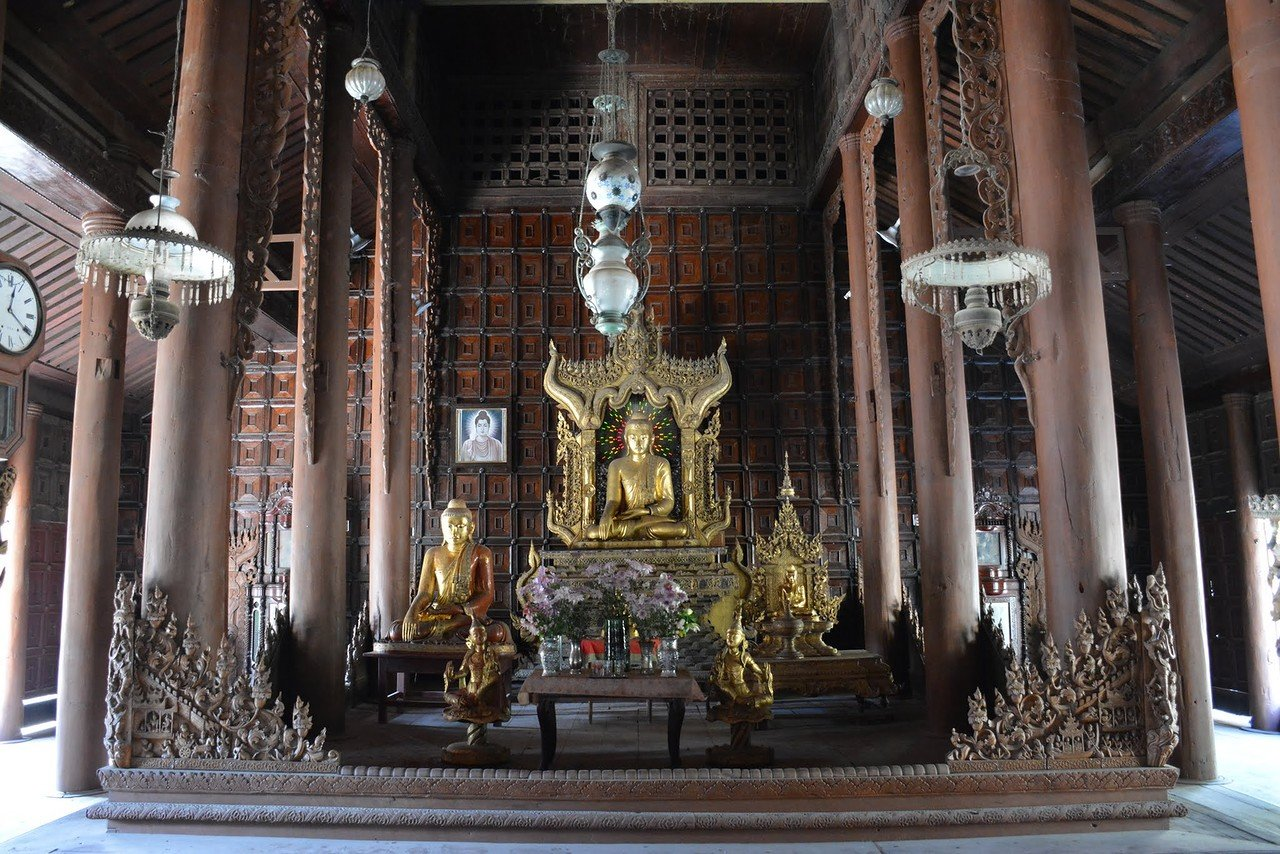
