= Atumashi Monastery =

Buddhist monastery in Mandalay, Myanmar

- မဟာ အတုလဝေယန် ကျောင်းတော်ကြီး
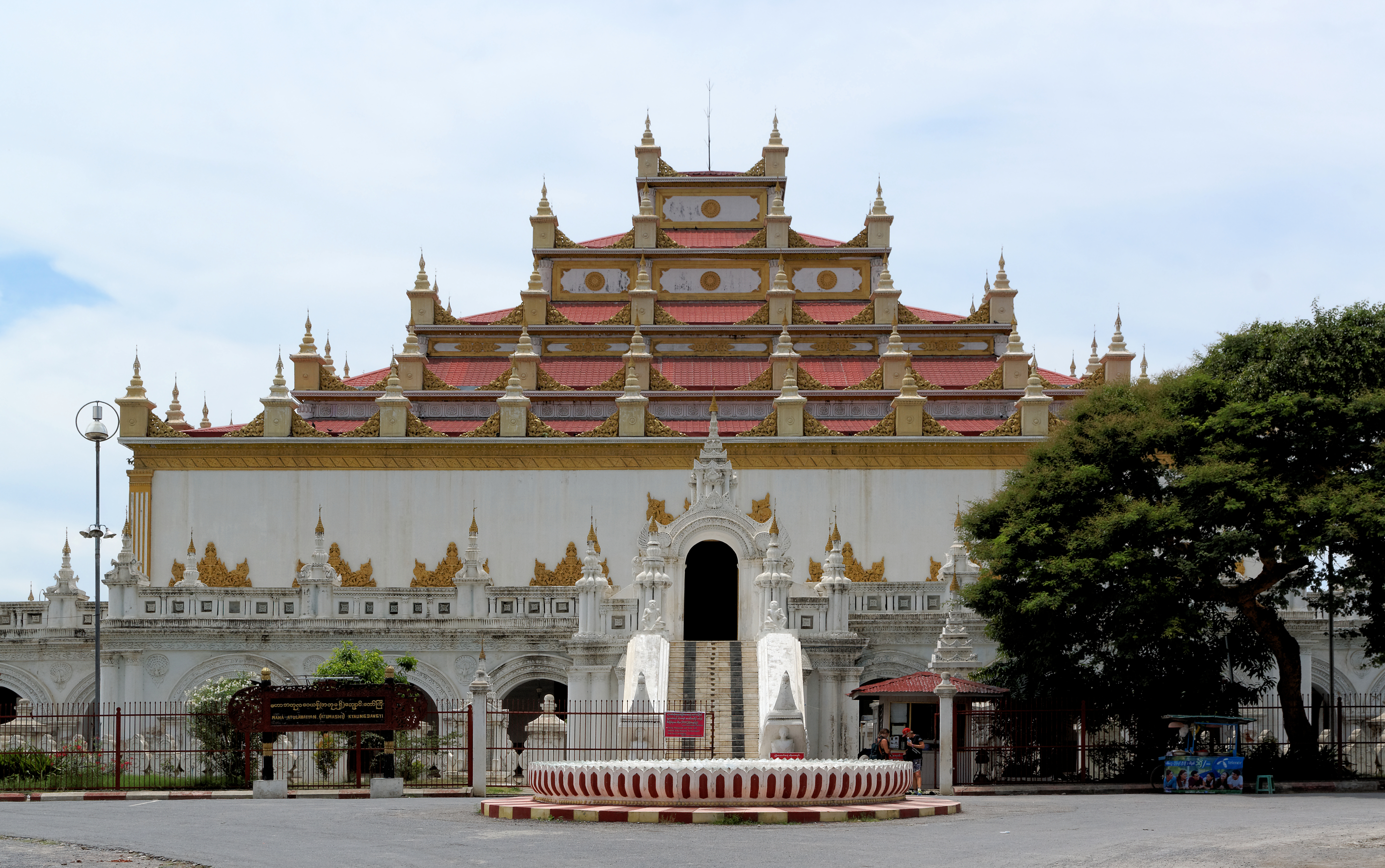

- Location within Myanmar

Religion
- Affiliation: Theravada Buddhism

Location
- Country: Mandalay, Mandalay Region, Burma
- Coordinates: 22°0′3″N 96°6′45″E

Architecture
- Founder: King Mindon Min
- Completed: 1857 (169 years ago); Reconstructed 1996

The Atumashi Monastery (Burmese: အတုမရှိကျောင်း [ʔətṵməʃḭ tɕáʊɰ̃]; formally Mahā Atulaveyan Kyaungdawgyi or မဟာ အတုလဝေယန် ကျောင်းတော်ကြီး [məhà ʔətṵla̰ wèjàɰ̃ tɕáʊɰ̃dɔ̀dʑí]) is a Buddhist monastery located in Mandalay, Myanmar (Burma).

== History ==
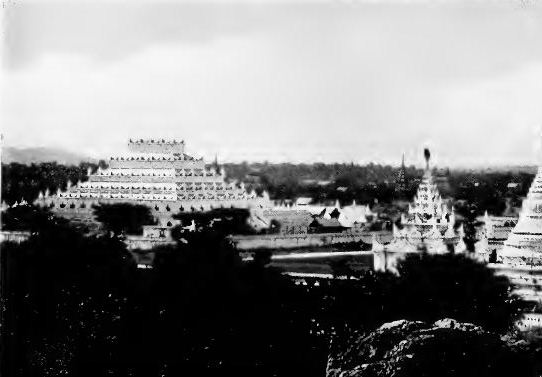
Atumashi Monastery in 1880s

It was built in 1857 by King Mindon, two years after the capital was moved to Mandalay. The monastery was built at a cost of 500,000 rupees. The original monastery structure was built using teak, covered with stucco on the outside, with its peculiar feature being that it was surmounted by five graduated rectangular terraces instead of the traditional pyatthats, Burmese-style tiered and spired roofs.

The structure burned down in 1890 after a fire in the city destroyed both the monastery and the 30 feet (9.1 m) tall Buddha image, as well as complete sets of the Tipitaka. During the fire, a 19.2-carat (32 ratti) diamond, which adorned the Buddha image (originally given to King Bodawphaya by Maha Nawrahta, the Governor of Arakan) disappeared as well.

In 1996, Burma's Archaeological Department reconstructed the monastery with prison labor.

== Images ==
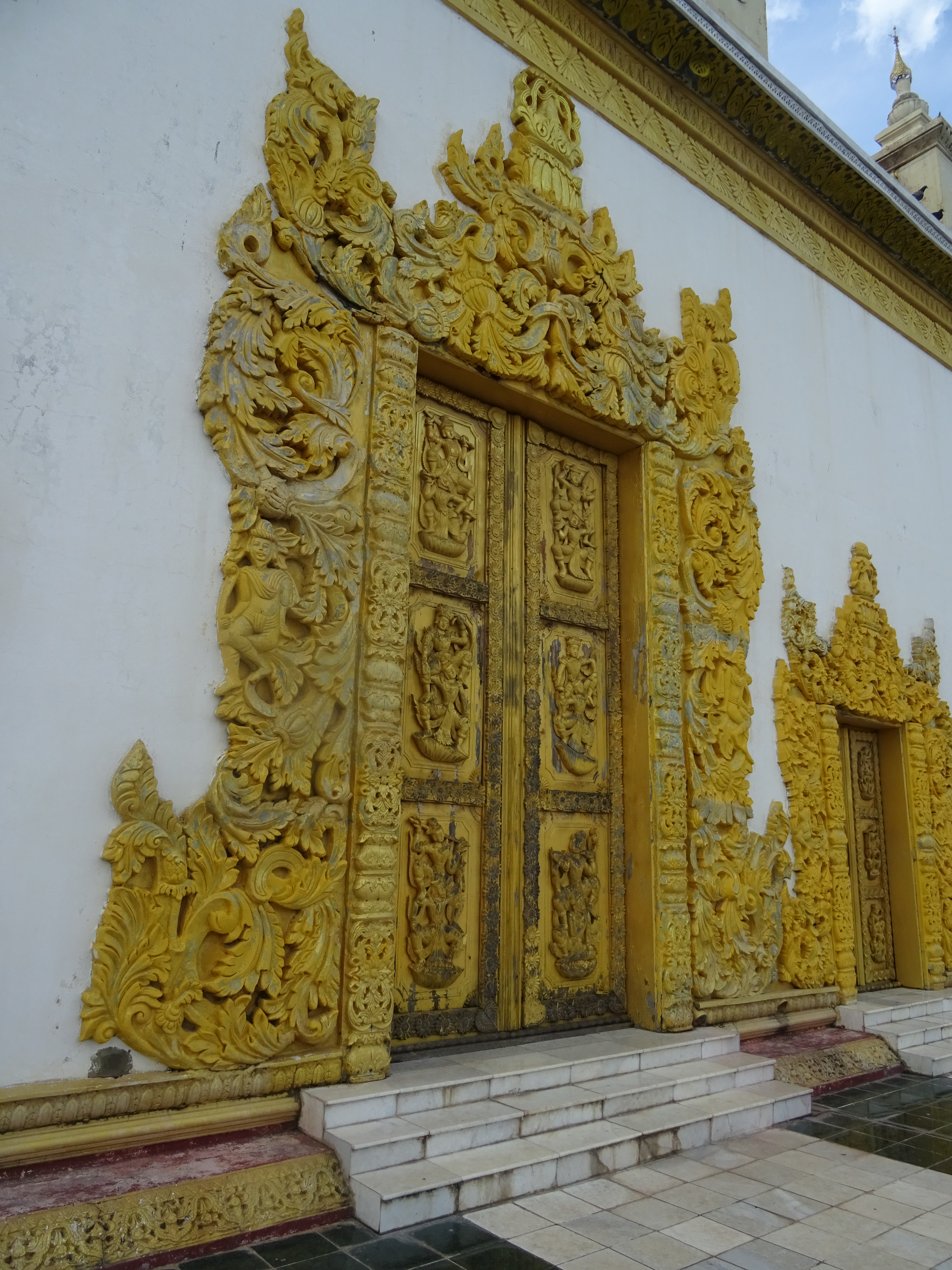
Golden door

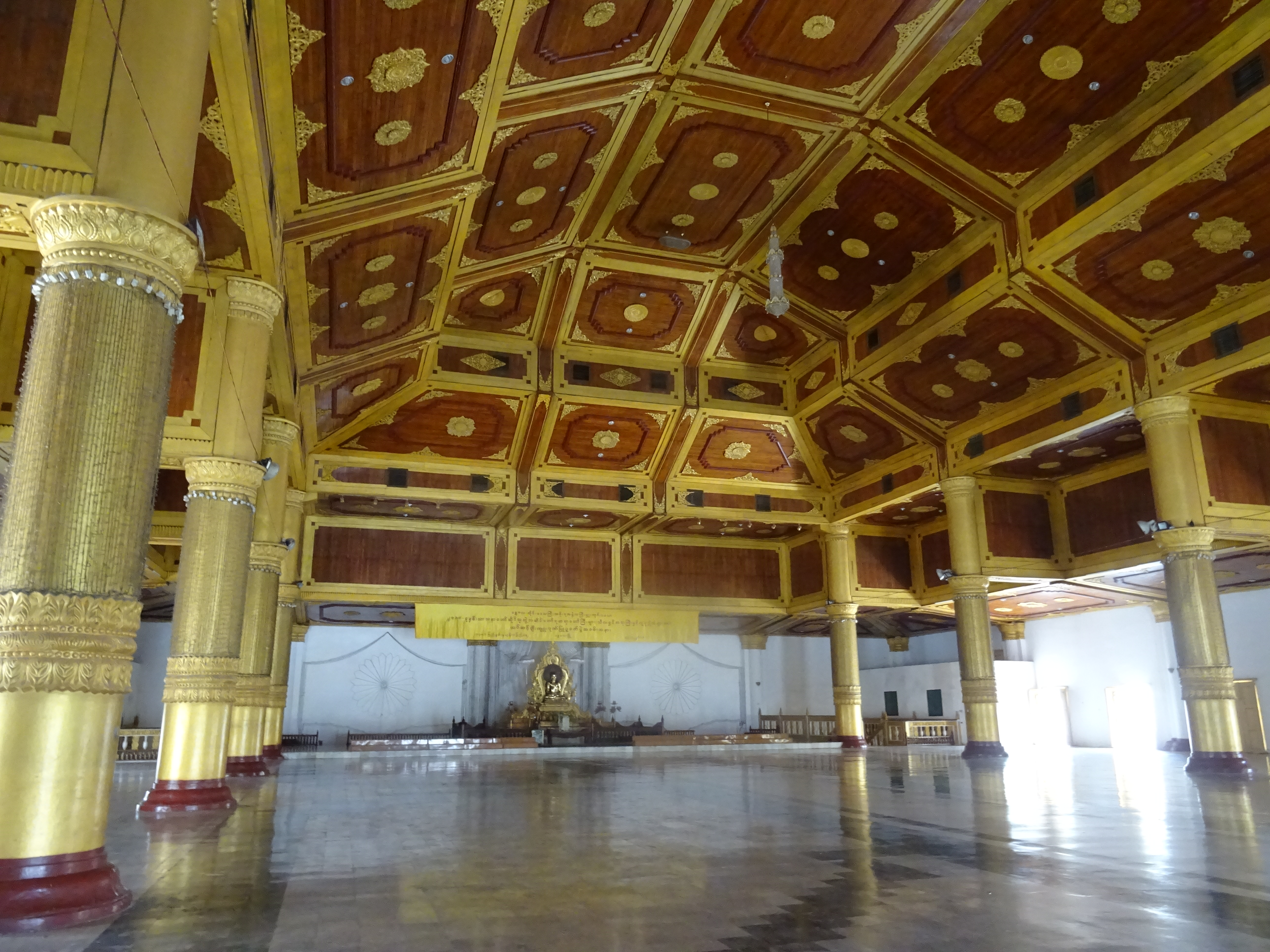
Interior
