= Mandalay =

Mandalay မန္တလေးမြို့
- City
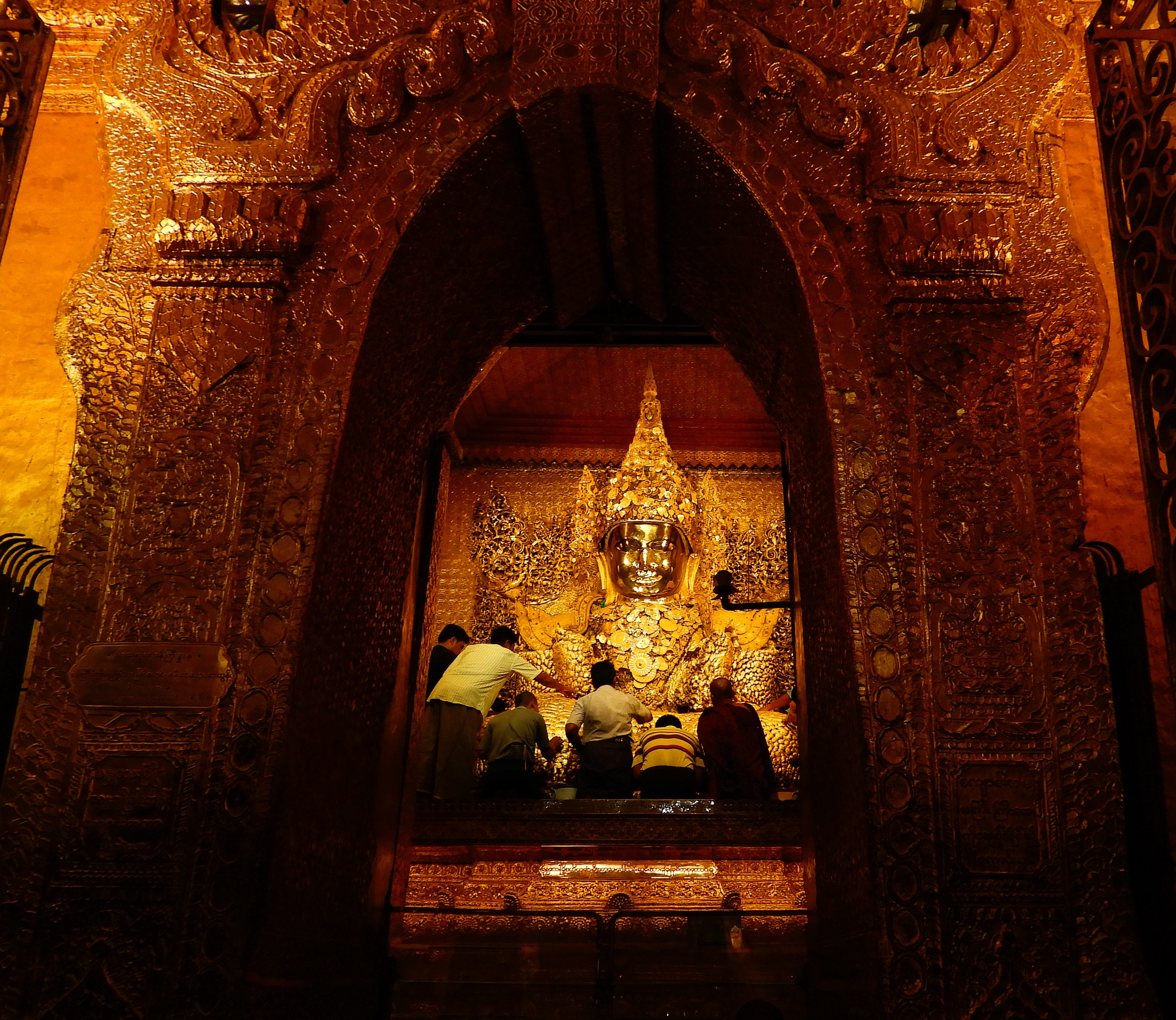
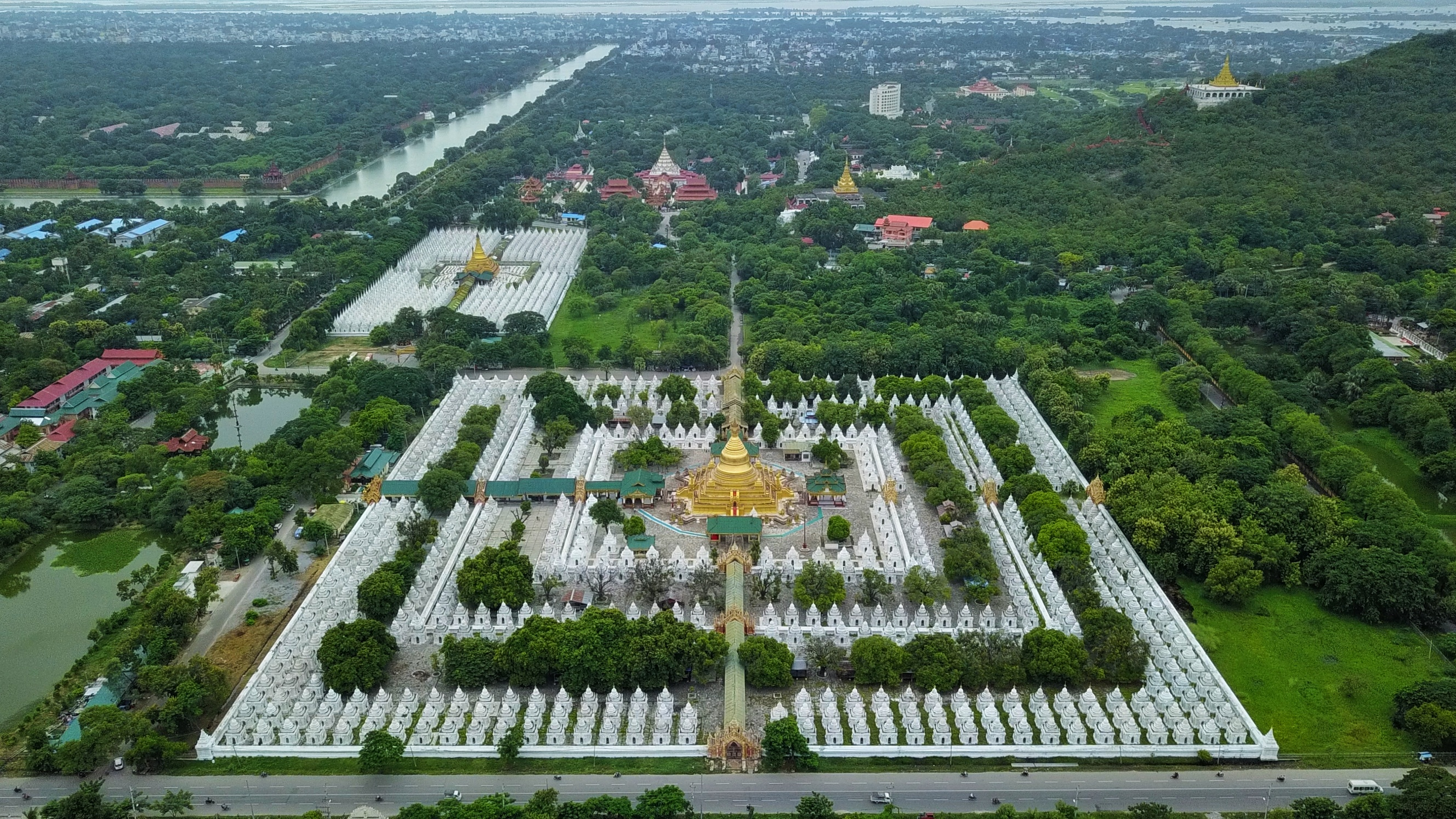
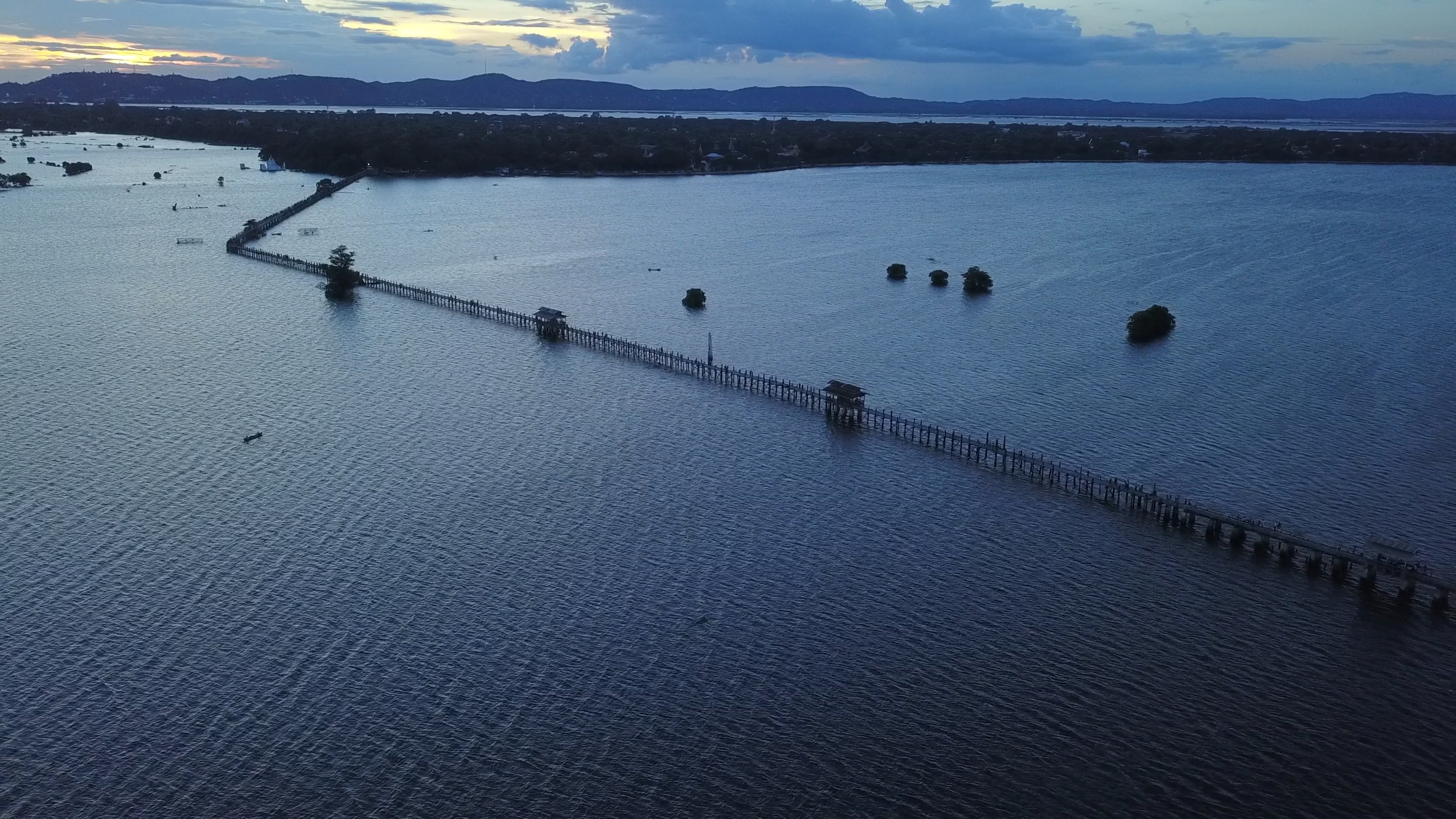
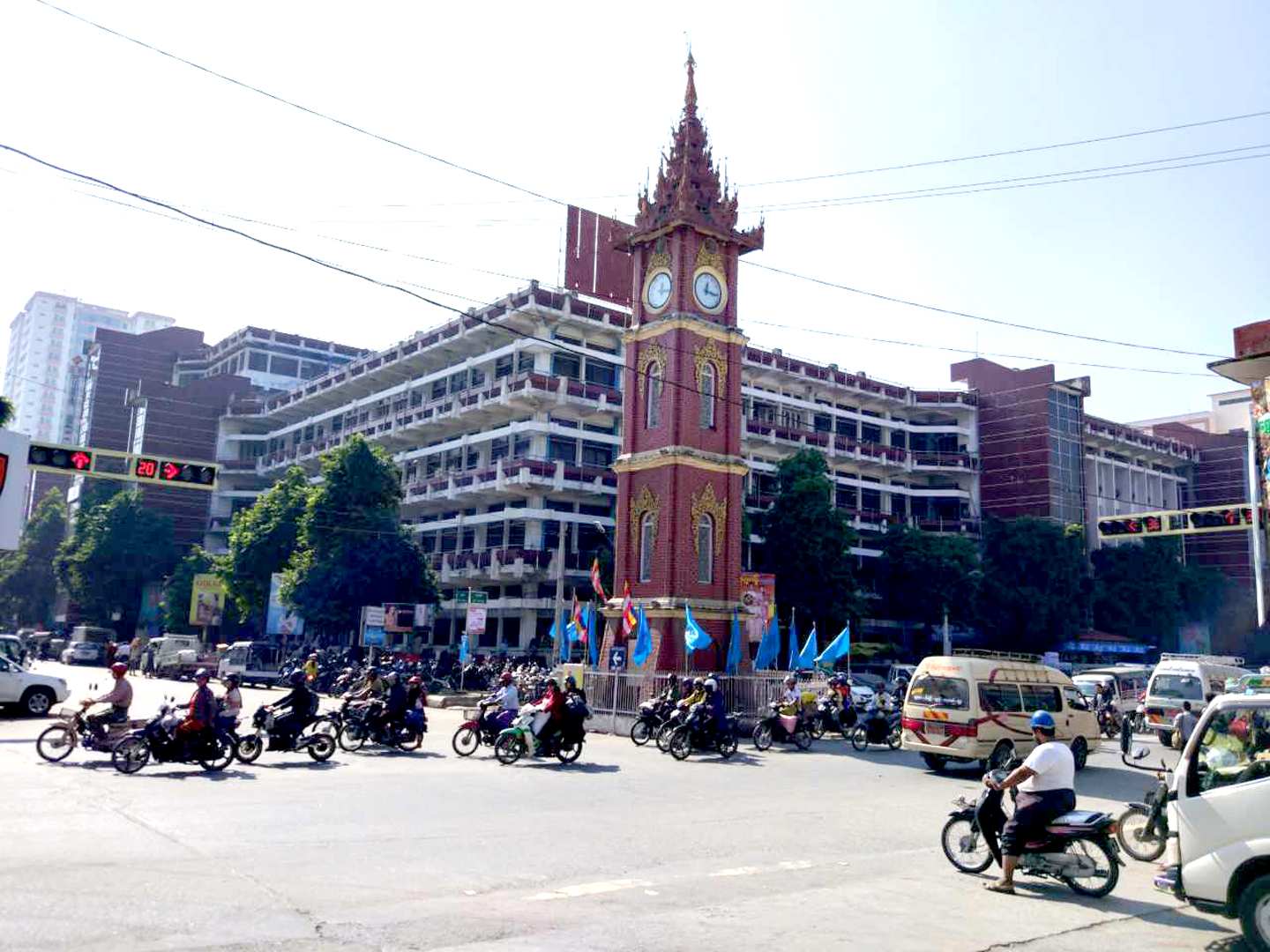
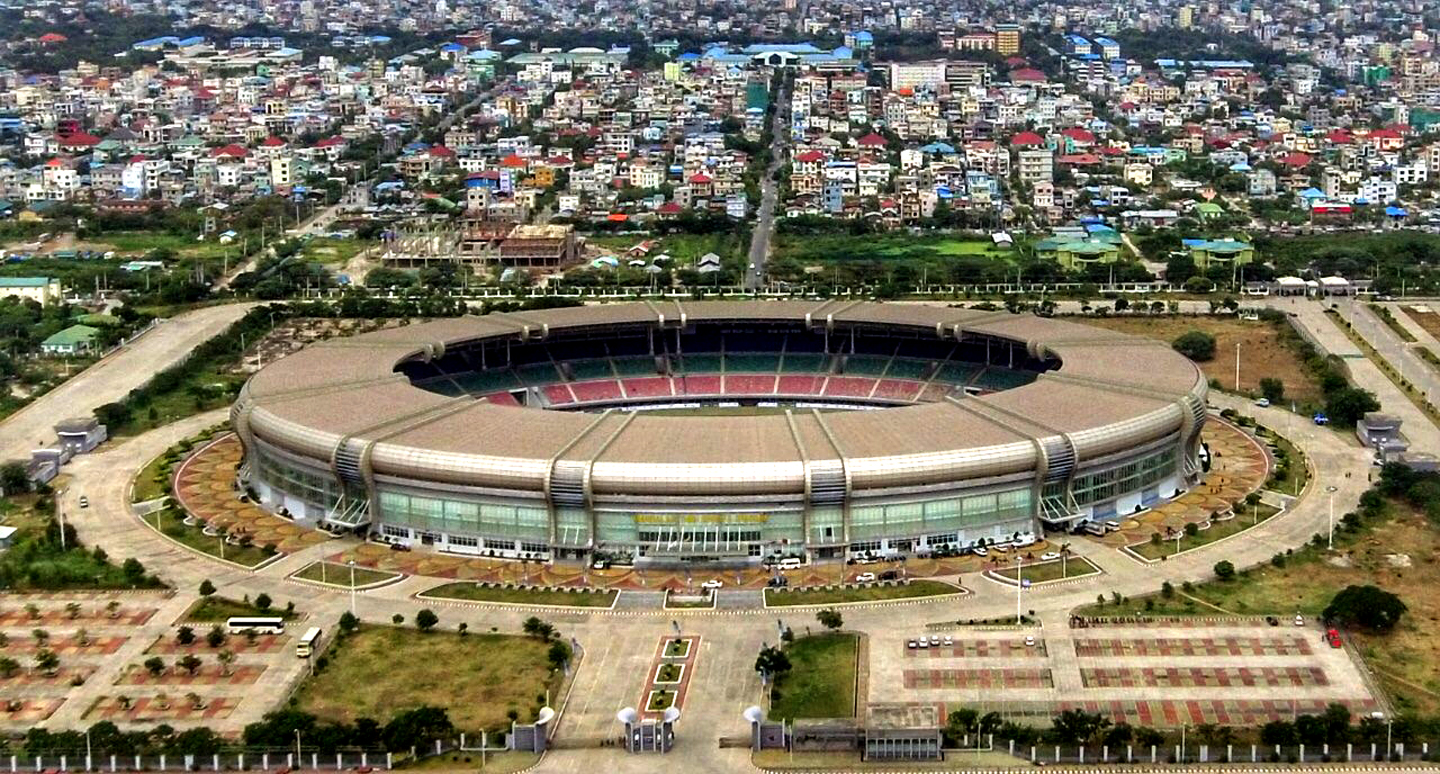
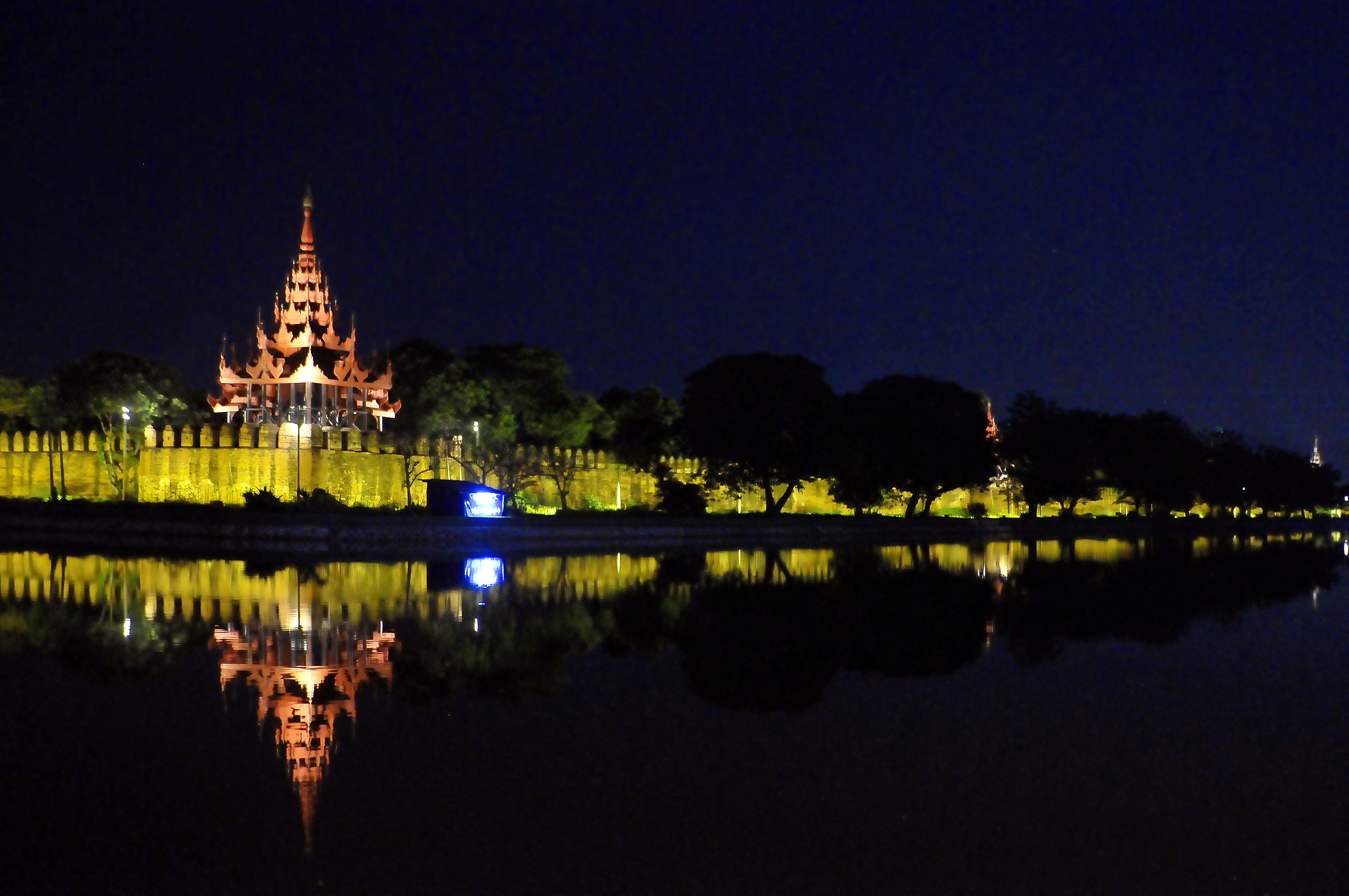
- Mahamuni Buddha Temple Kuthodaw Pagoda and Sandamuni Pagoda U Bein Bridge Zegyo Market Mandalar Thiri Stadium Mandalay Palace

- Flag
- Interactive map of Mandalay
- Location of Mandalay, Myanmar Mandalay (Asia)
- Coordinates: 21°58′59″N 96°05′04″E
- Country: Myanmar
- Region: Mandalay Region
- District: Maha Aungmye, Aungmyethazan and Amarapura
- Founded: 1857
- Founder: King Mindon

Government
  - Body: Mandalay City Development Committee
  - Mayor: U Khin Maung Aye

Area
  - City: 163.84 km^{2} (63.26 sq mi)
- Elevation: 22 m (72 ft)

Population (2014 Census)
  - City: 1,726,889
  - Rank: 2nd
  - Density: 10,540/km^{2} (27,299/sq mi)
  - Urban: 1,319,452 (76%)
  - Rural: 407,437 (24%)
  - Ethnic groups: Bamar; Chinese; Shan & other minorities
  - Religions: Theravada Buddhism Christianity Hinduism Islam
- Demonym: Mandalayan
- Time zone: UTC+6:30 (MMT)
- Area code: 02
- Vehicle registration: MDY

Mandalay (Note: /ˌmændəˈleɪ/ or /ˈmændəleɪ/; Burmese: မန္တလေးမြို့, MLCTS: manta.le: [máɰ̃dəlé]) is the second-largest city in Myanmar, after Yangon. It is located on the east bank of the Irrawaddy River, 631 km (392 mi) north of Yangon. In 2014, the city had a population of 1,225,553.

Mandalay was founded in 1857 by King Mindon, replacing Amarapura as the new royal capital of the Konbaung dynasty. It was Burma's final royal capital before the kingdom's annexation by the British Empire in 1885. Under British rule, Mandalay remained commercially and culturally important despite the rise of Yangon, the new capital of British Burma. The city suffered extensive destruction during the Japanese conquest of Burma in the Second World War. In 1948, Mandalay became part of the newly independent Union of Burma.

Today, Mandalay is the economic centre of Upper Myanmar and considered the centre of Burmese culture. A continuing influx of irregular Chinese immigrants, mostly from Yunnan, since the late 20th century, has reshaped the city's ethnic makeup and increased commerce with China. Despite Naypyidaw's recent rise, Mandalay remains Upper Myanmar's main commercial, educational and health center.

== Etymology ==
The city gets its name from the nearby Mandalay Hill. The name is probably a derivative of a Pali word, although the exact word of origin remains unclear. The root word has been speculated to be maṇḍala (မဏ္ဍလ), referring to circular plains or Mandara, a mountain from Hindu mythology.

When it was founded in 1857, the royal city was officially named Yadanarbon (ရတနာပုံ, [jədənàbòʊɰ̃]), a loan of the Pali name Ratanapūra (ရတနပူရ) "City of Gems." It was also called Lay Kyun Aung Myei (လေးကျွန်းအောင်မြေ, [lé dʑʊ́ɰ̃ àʊɰ̃ mjè], 'Victorious Land over the Four Islands') and Mandalay Palace (မြနန်းစံကျော်, [mja̰ náɰ̃ sàɰ̃ tɕɔ̀], 'Famed Royal Emerald Palace').

== History ==
=== Early history ===
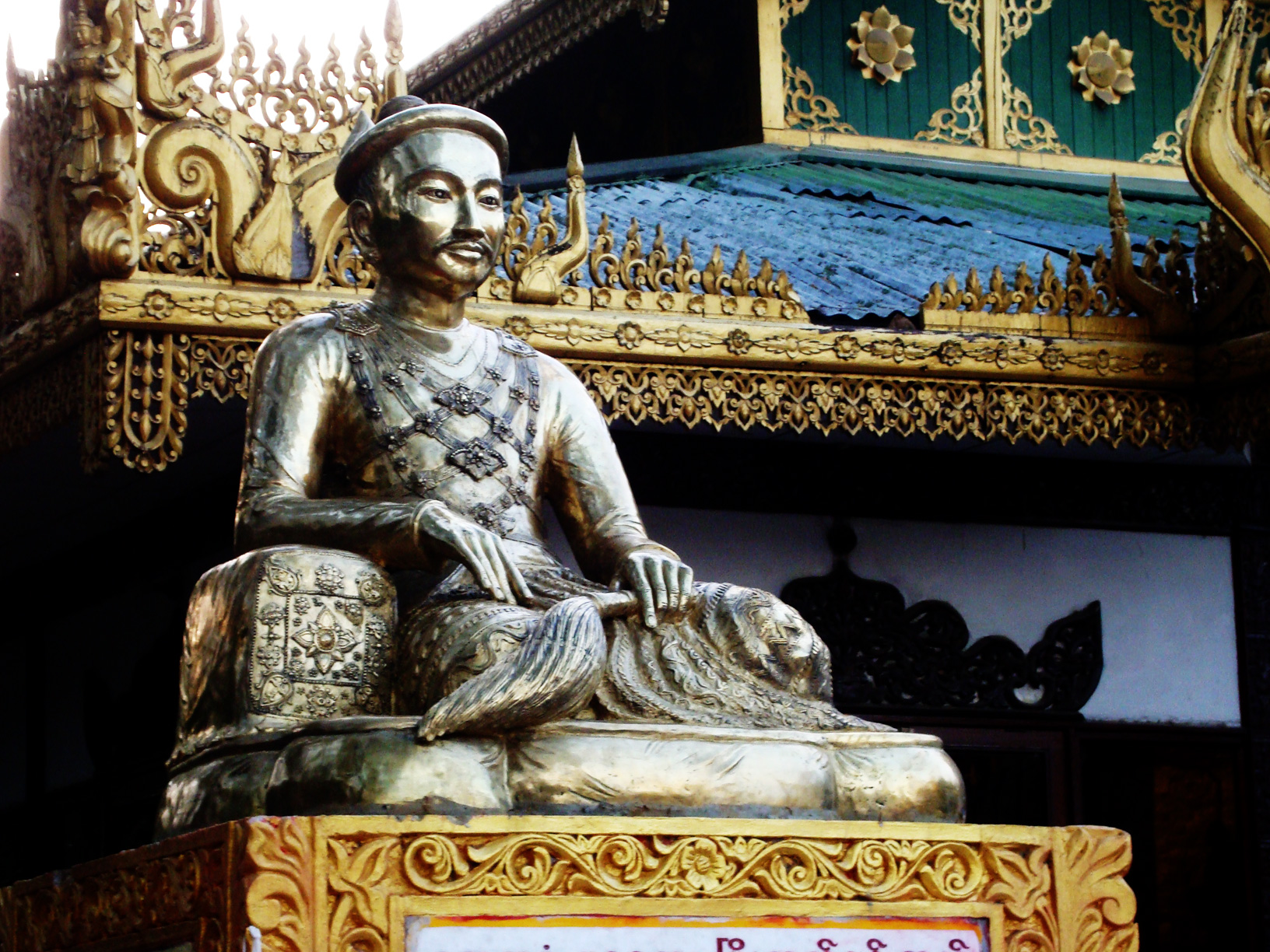
King Mindon is the founder of Mandalay royal capital

Like most former (and present) capitals of Burma, Mandalay was founded at the wishes of the ruler of the day. On 13 February 1857, King Mindon founded a new royal capital at the foot of Mandalay Hill, ostensibly to fulfill a prophecy on the founding of a metropolis of Buddhism in that exact place on the occasion of the 2,400th jubilee of Buddhism.

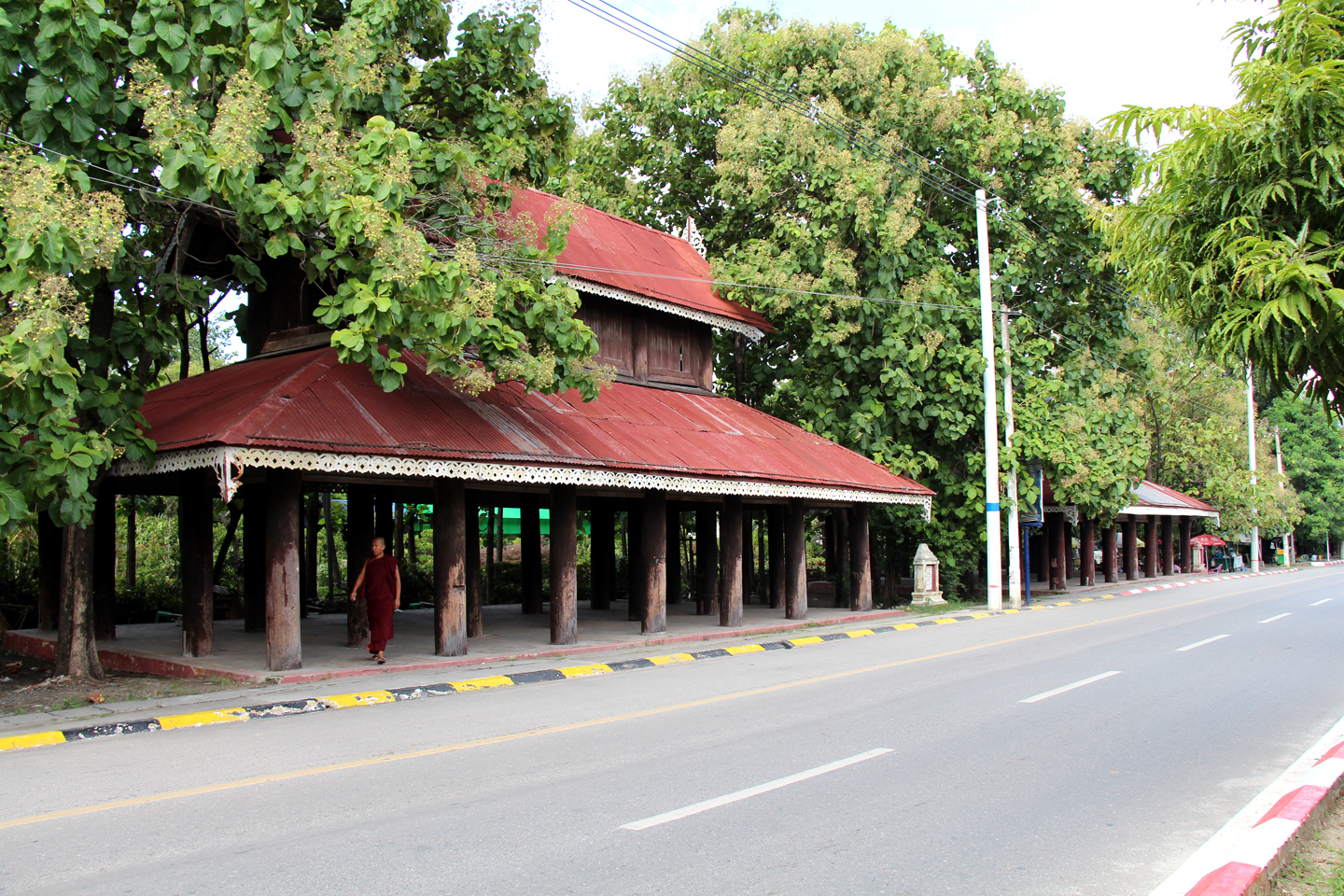
The Thudamma zayats built during the reign of Mindon Min

The new capital city site was 66 km^{2} (25.5 sq mi) in area, surrounded by four rivers. The plan called for a 144-square block grid patterned citadel, anchored by a 16 square block royal palace compound at the center by Mandalay Hill. The 1,020-acre (413-hectare) citadel was surrounded by four 2,032 m (6,666 ft) long walls and a moat 64 m (210 ft) wide, 4.6 m (15 ft) deep. At intervals of 169 m (555 ft) along the wall, were turrets with gold-tipped spires for watchmen. The walls had three gates on each side, and five bridges to cross the moat. In addition, the king also commissioned the Kuthodaw Pagoda, the Pahtan-haw Shwe Thein Ordination Hall, the Thudamma zayats or public houses for preaching Buddhism and a library for the Pāli Canon.

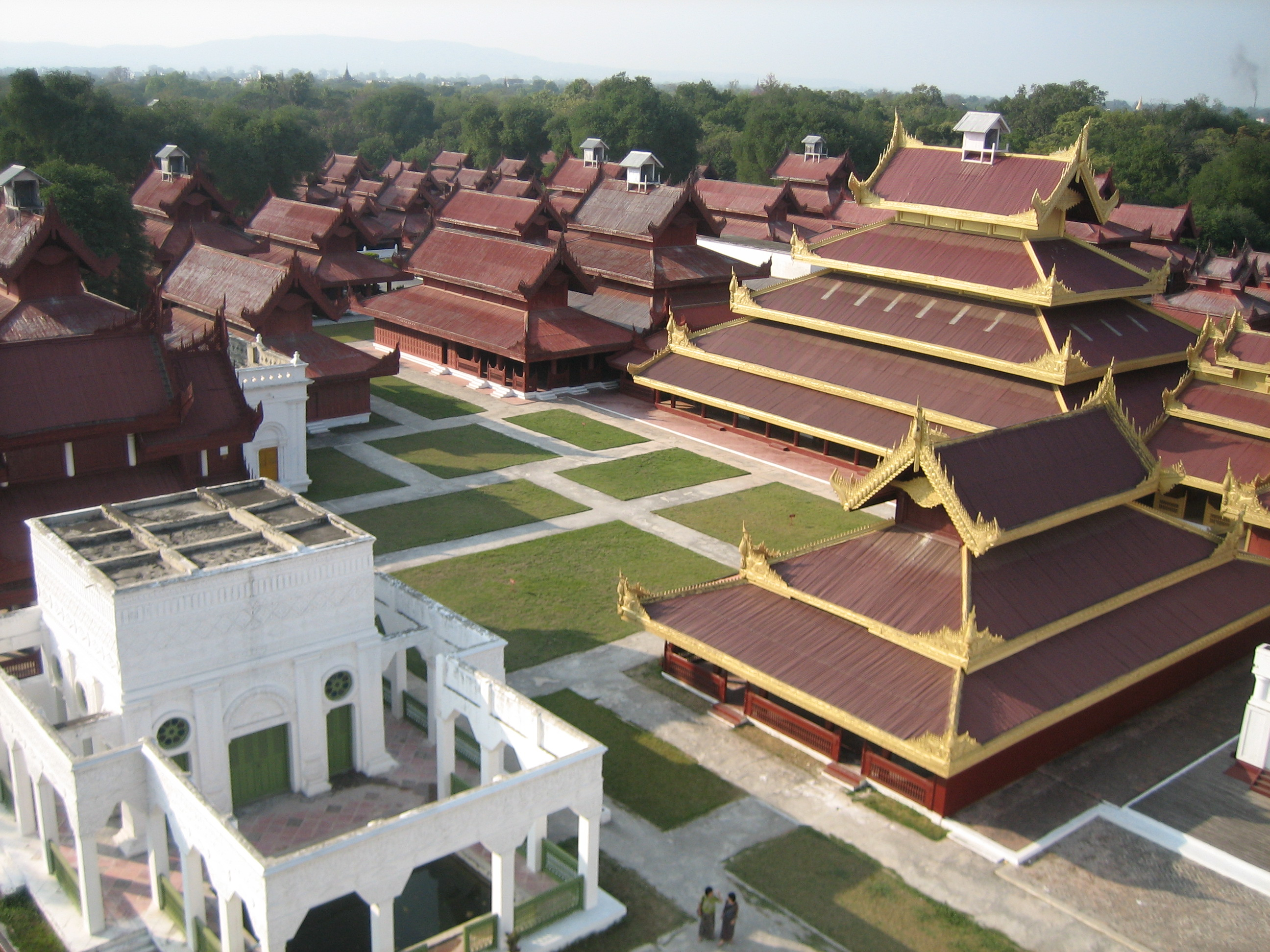
Mandalay Palace Grounds

In June 1857, the former royal palace of Amarapura was dismantled and moved by elephants to the new location at the foot of Mandalay Hill, although construction of the palace compound was officially completed only two years later, on Monday, 23 May 1859.

For the next 26 years, Mandalay was to be the last royal capital of the Konbaung dynasty, the last independent Burmese kingdom before its final annexation by the British Empire. Mandalay ceased to be the capital on 28 November 1885 when the British conquered the city and sent Thibaw Min and his queen Supayalat into exile in India. Moreover, a group of drunken soldiers set fire to the Pitakataik (Royal Library) which had contained the genealogies of kings and the kingdom's official records. Mandalay was razed. However, the palace, its structures and the city walls were spared destruction.

=== Colonial Mandalay (1885–1948) ===
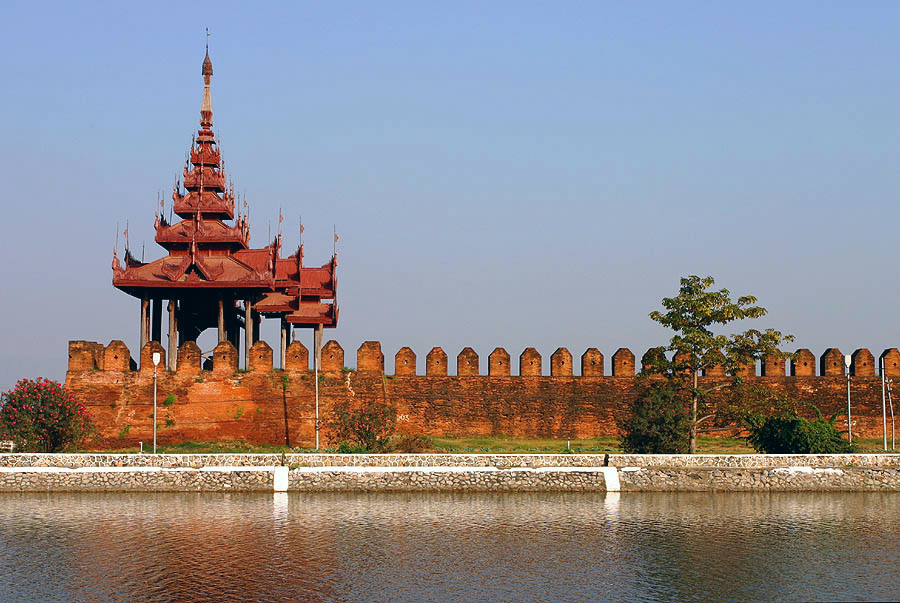
A bastion at Mandalay Palace

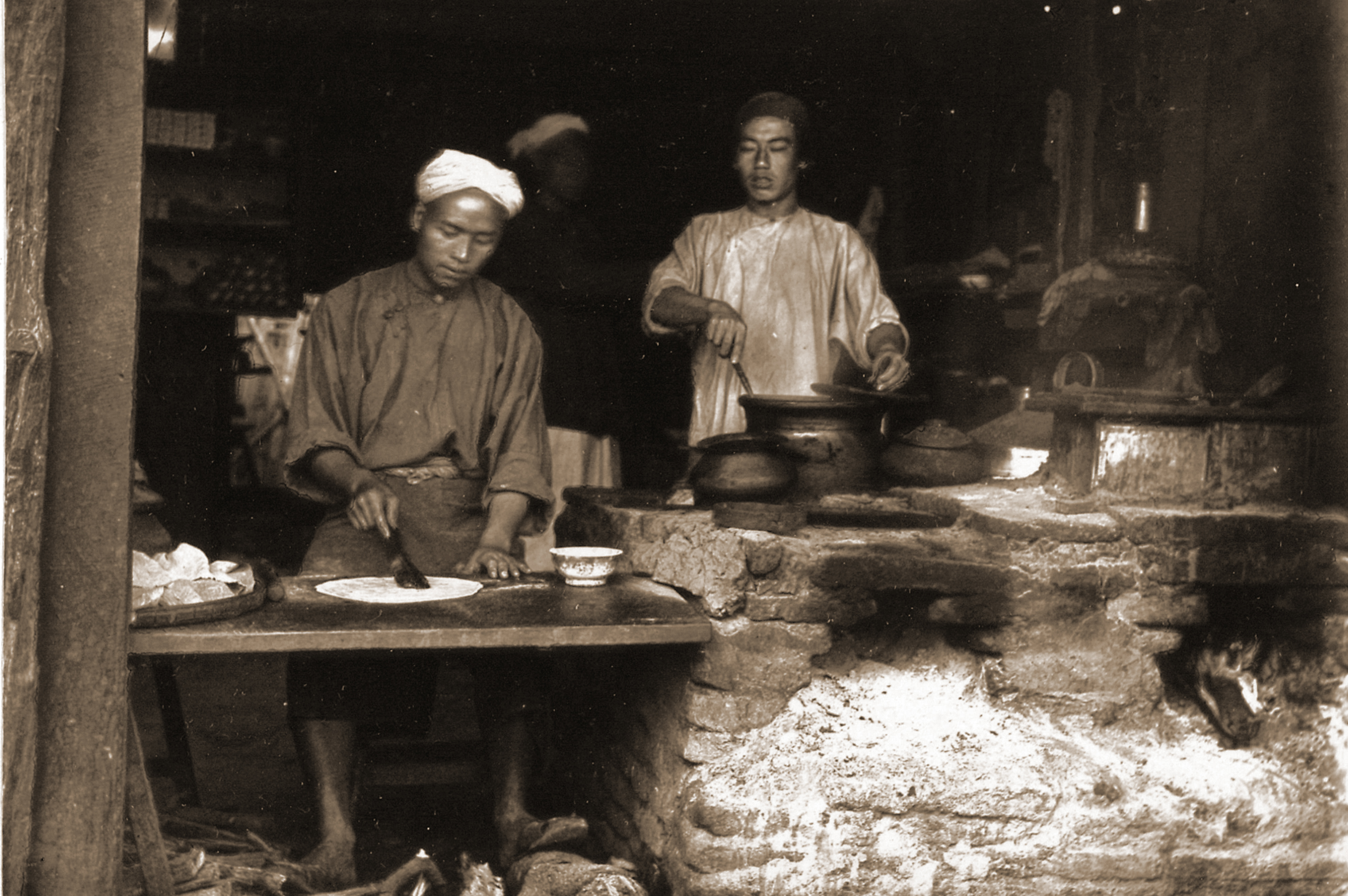
Old street scene in Chinatown of Mandalay during the British colonial period

While Mandalay would continue to be the chief city of Upper Burma during the British colonial rule, the commercial and political importance had irreversibly shifted to Yangon. The British view on the development of Mandalay (and Burma) was mainly with commercial intentions. While rail transport reached Mandalay in 1889, less than four years after the annexation, the first college in Mandalay, Mandalay College, was not established until 40 years later, in 1925. The British looted the palace, with some of the treasures going on display in the Victoria and Albert Museum; in 1964 they were returned to Burma as a gesture of goodwill. The British also renamed the palace compound Fort Dufferin and used it to billet troops.

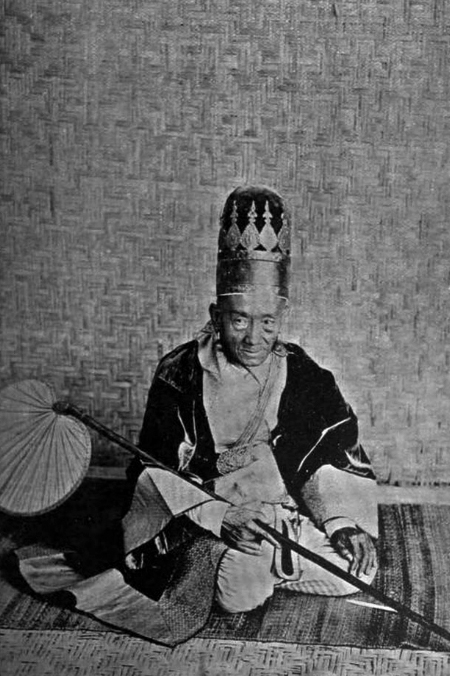
Myowun (Mayor) of Mandalay, c. 1900

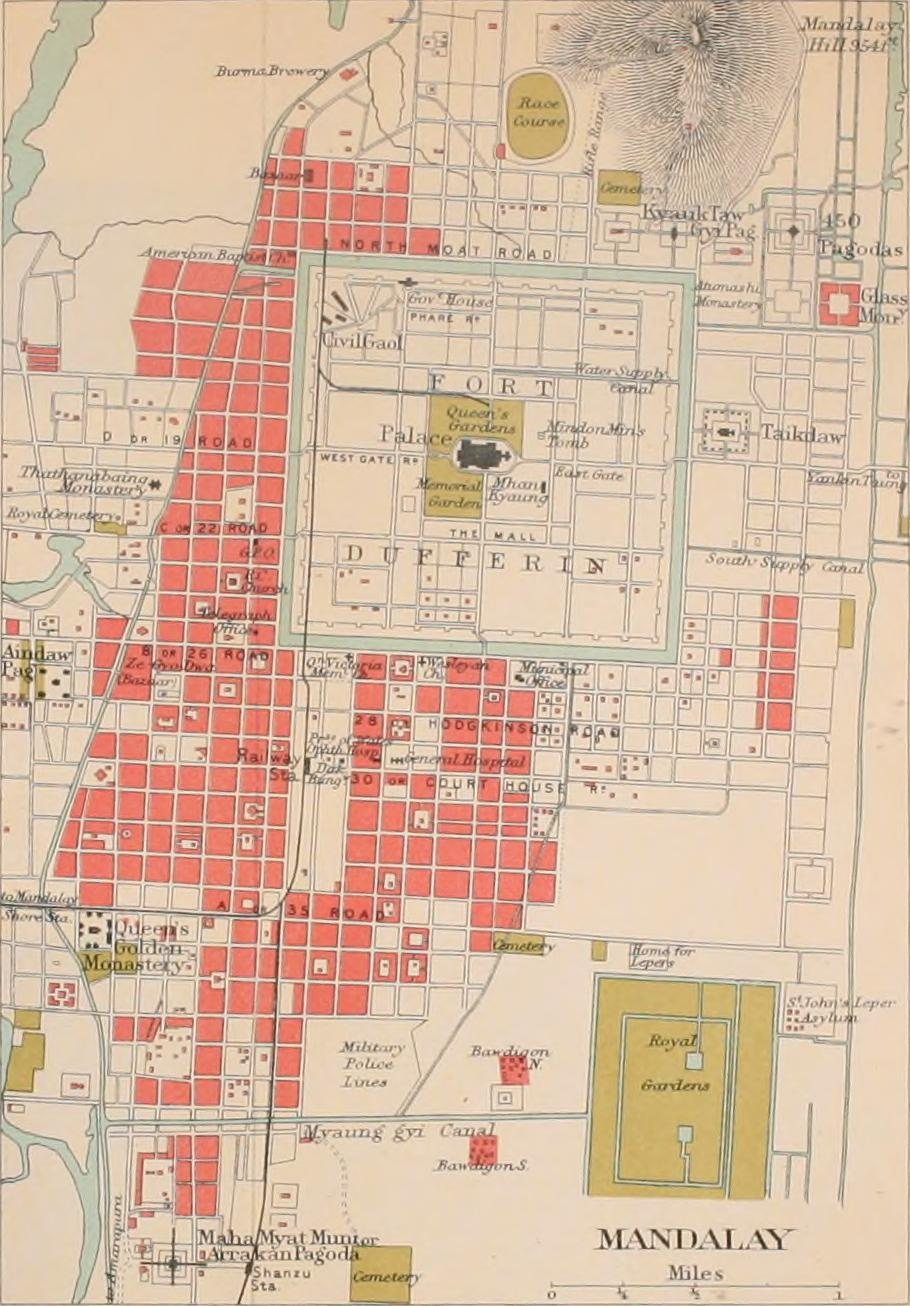
Map of Mandalay, 1911

Throughout the colonial years, Mandalay was the centre of Burmese culture and Buddhist learning, and as the last royal capital, was regarded by the Burmese as a primary symbol of sovereignty and identity. Between the two World Wars, the city was Upper Burma's focal point in a series of nationwide protests against the British rule. The British rule brought in many immigrants from India to the city. In 1904–1905, a plague caused about one-third of the population to flee the city.

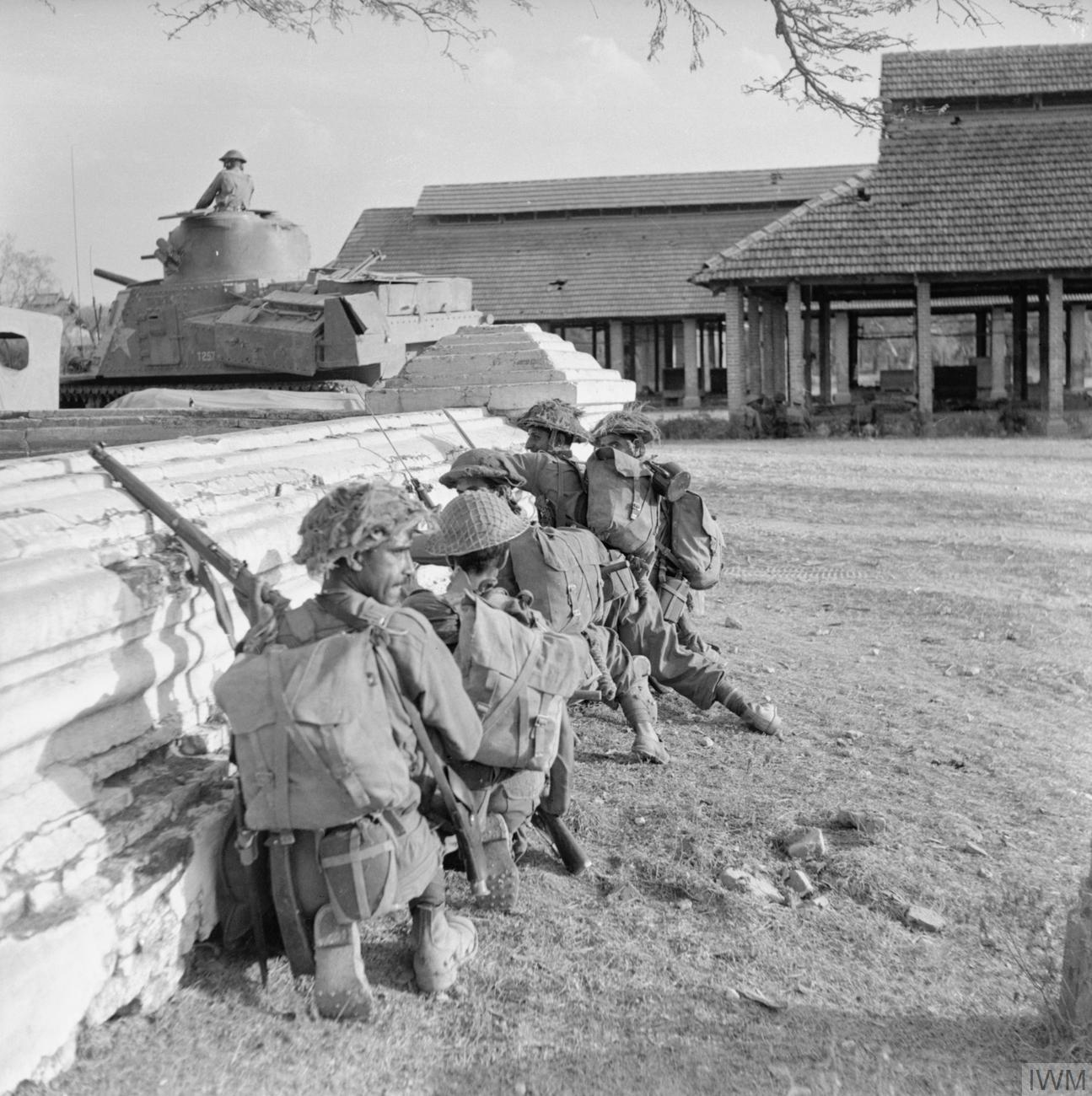
Troops of 19th Indian Division and a Lee tank in action during street fighting in Mandalay, 9–10 March 1945.

During World War II, Mandalay suffered devastating air raids. On 3 April 1942, during the Japanese conquest of Burma, the Imperial Japanese Army Air Service carried out an extensive assault. The city was in effect defenseless as its firefighting resources were weak, having been lost in earlier bombing, it had no anti-aircraft capacity, and the British RAF had by now withdrawn all its aircraft to India. Three-fifths of Mandalay's houses were destroyed and 2,000 civilians were killed. Many residents also fled when the city was under Japanese occupation from May 1942 to March 1945. The palace citadel, which had been turned into a supply depot by the Japanese, was in turn burnt to the ground by Allied bombing; only the royal mint and the watch tower survived. (A faithful replica of the palace was rebuilt in the 1990s.)

=== Contemporary Mandalay (1948–present) ===
After the country gained independence from Britain in 1948, Mandalay continued to be the main cultural, educational and economic hub of Upper Burma. Until the early 1990s, most students from Upper Burma went to Mandalay for university education. Until 1991, Mandalay University, the University of Medicine, Mandalay and the Defence Services Academy were the only three universities in Upper Burma. Only a few other cities had "Degree Colleges" affiliated with Mandalay University that offered a limited number of subjects. Today, the city attracts a fraction of students as the military government requires students to attend their local universities in order to reduce concentration of students in one place.

In November 1959, Mandalay celebrated its centennial with a festival at the foot of Mandalay Hill. Special commemorative stamps were issued.

During Ne Win's isolationist rule (1962–1988), the city's infrastructure deteriorated. By the early 1980s, the second largest city of Burma resembled a town with low-rise buildings and dusty streets filled mostly with bicycles. In the 1980s, the city was hit by two major fires. In May 1981, a fire razed more than 6,000 houses and public buildings, leaving more than 90,000 homeless. On 24 March 1984, another fire destroyed 2,700 buildings and made 23,000 people homeless. The fire caused US$96 million in property damage.

Fires continue to plague the city. A major fire destroyed Mandalay's second largest market, Yadanabon Market, in February 2008, and another major fire in February 2009 destroyed 320 homes and left over 1600 people homeless.

On 28 March 2025, a magnitude 7.7 earthquake with an epicenter northwest of the city caused extensive damage. The earthquake killed more than 5,300 people across Myanmar including 3,300 deaths in Mandalay and the surrounding townships. At least 1,736 people were killed in Mandalay District alone. The National Unity Government estimated that 17,637 homes were damaged across the region. In Mandalay, major historical sites, such the gates and walls of Mandalay Palace, Mahamuni Buddha Temple, and Shwesayan Pagodas incurred significant damage.

=== Illegal Chinese immigration ===
The 1980s fires ushered in a significant change in the city's physical character and ethnic makeup. Huge swaths of land left vacant by the fires were later purchased, mostly by the ethnic Han Chinese, many of whom were recent immigrants from Yunnan. The Chinese influx accelerated after the State Peace and Development Council came to power in 1988. Many Chinese immigrants from Yunnan and, to a lesser extent, Sichuan poured into Upper Burma in the 1990s, and many ended up in Mandalay living there illegally. In the 1990s alone, about 250,000 to 300,000 Yunnanese are estimated to have migrated to Mandalay. Today, ethnic Chinese people are believed to make up about 40%–50% of the city's population that is nearly the same as the natives, and are a major factor in the city's doubling of population from about 500,000 in 1980 to one million in 2008. Chinese festivals are now firmly embedded in the city's cultural calendar. The Chinese dominance in the city center has pushed out the rest to the suburbs. The urban sprawl now encompasses Amarapura, the very city King Mindon left some 150 years ago. Mandalay celebrated its 150th birthday on 15 May 2009, at precisely 4:31:36 am.

Most new immigrants from China in recent times move to Mandalay for business, and do not intend to settle there. Being poorer, they rely on Burmese Chinese already in Mandalay helping them negotiate the local economic landscape. These "new Chinese" tend to settle outside Mandalay, as the central city's Burmese Chinese areas are too expensive for them. These areas become new Chinese neighbourhoods as they develop and are recognisably distinct from the older Chinese quarters. The cultural attitudes of Chinese businesspeople in Mandalay who view local Burmese to easy-going fuel tensions with local Burmese perceive the Chinese as condescending.

== Geography ==
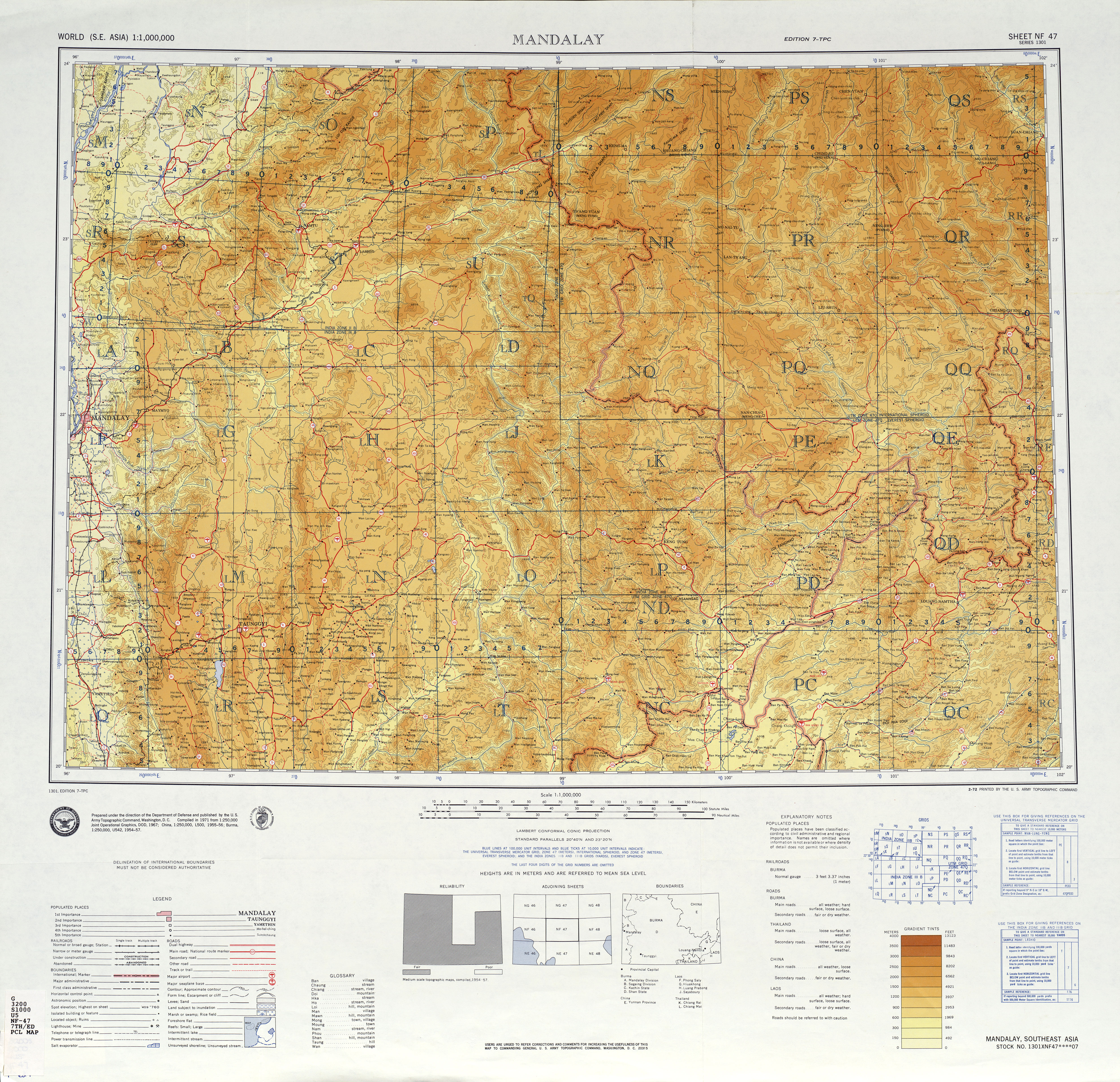
Map of Mandalay and surrounding region from the International Map of the World (1971)

Mandalay is located in the central Dry Zone of Burma by the Irrawaddy river at 21.98° North, 96.08° East, 80 meters (260 feet) above sea level. Its standard time zone is UTC/GMT +6:30 hours and is 626 km from Yangon.

Mandalay lies along the Sagaing Fault, a tectonic plate boundary between the India and Sunda plates. The biggest earthquake in its history occurred on 23 March 1839, when an estimated magnitude 8.2 destroyed the former capital Ava and caused extreme destruction in nearby cities. Another strong quake with a magnitude of 7 occurred in 1956. The devastation was greatest in nearby Sagaing, and it came to be known as the Great Sagaing Quake.

On 28 March 2025, a magnitude 7.7 earthquake occurred just north of Mandalay on the Sagaing fault.

Bodies of water near Mandalay are Mandalay Kantawgyi, a small lake and Irrawaddy River to the west of the city.

== Climate ==
Although the rain shadow of the Arakan Mountains is powerful, the city qualifies as having a tropical wet and dry climate (Köppen climate classification: Aw), bordering a hot semi-arid climate (BSh), though if using 1981–2010 data, Mandalay does qualify as hot semi-arid (BSh).

Mandalay features noticeably warmer and cooler periods of the year. Average temperatures in January, the mildest month, hover around 22 °C or 71.6 °F while the hottest month, April, averages 32 °C or 89.6 °F. Mandalay is very hot in the months of April and May, with average high temperatures easily exceeding 37 °C or 99 °F. It is not uncommon to see high temperatures surpass 40 °C or 104 °F during these two months in the city. Mandalay also features wet and dry seasons of nearly equal length, with the wet season running from May through October and the dry season covering the remaining six months. The highest reliably recorded temperature in Mandalay is 45.0 °C (113.0 °F) on 12 May 2010 while the lowest is 7.6 °C (45.7 °F) on 26 December 1999. There is considerably more diurnal temperature variation in the dry season than the wet season.

Climate data for Mandalay (1991–2020, extremes 1889–present)
Month	Jan	Feb	Mar	Apr	May	Jun	Jul	Aug	Sep	Oct	Nov	Dec	Year
Record high °C (°F)	37.2 (99.0)	39.2 (102.6)	42.8 (109.0)	44.8 (112.6)	45.0 (113.0)	42.0 (107.6)	41.6 (106.9)	40.5 (104.9)	43.4 (110.1)	39.2 (102.6)	38.5 (101.3)	34.5 (94.1)	45.0 (113.0)
Mean daily maximum °C (°F)	29.8 (85.6)	33.2 (91.8)	37.0 (98.6)	39.1 (102.4)	37.1 (98.8)	35.6 (96.1)	35.4 (95.7)	34.3 (93.7)	34.2 (93.6)	33.4 (92.1)	31.7 (89.1)	29.3 (84.7)	34.2 (93.6)
Daily mean °C (°F)	22.0 (71.6)	24.8 (76.6)	29.0 (84.2)	32.0 (89.6)	31.6 (88.9)	30.9 (87.6)	30.8 (87.4)	30.1 (86.2)	29.9 (85.8)	28.8 (83.8)	26.0 (78.8)	22.6 (72.7)	28.2 (82.8)
Mean daily minimum °C (°F)	14.2 (57.6)	16.3 (61.3)	20.9 (69.6)	25.0 (77.0)	26.0 (78.8)	26.3 (79.3)	26.3 (79.3)	25.9 (78.6)	25.6 (78.1)	24.2 (75.6)	20.3 (68.5)	15.8 (60.4)	22.2 (72.0)
Record low °C (°F)	8.0 (46.4)	10.0 (50.0)	12.8 (55.0)	15.0 (59.0)	17.4 (63.3)	20.0 (68.0)	20.0 (68.0)	19.5 (67.1)	20.5 (68.9)	18.5 (65.3)	11.1 (52.0)	7.6 (45.7)	7.6 (45.7)
Average precipitation mm (inches)	5.3 (0.21)	3.1 (0.12)	7.2 (0.28)	42.1 (1.66)	151.8 (5.98)	90.8 (3.57)	73.2 (2.88)	159.5 (6.28)	176.7 (6.96)	142.8 (5.62)	36.3 (1.43)	5.5 (0.22)	894.3 (35.21)
Average precipitation days (≥ 1.0 mm)	0.6	0.5	1.0	4.2	9.9	7.8	6.9	10.3	11.6	8.8	3.0	0.6	65.1
Average relative humidity (%)	68	58	49	50	66	73	71	76	76	77	74	72	68
Mean monthly sunshine hours	309	280	301	291	267	208	182	168	215	223	269	278	2,991
Source 1: NCEI
Source 2: Danish Meteorological Institute (sun and relative humidity, 1931–1960), Meteo Climat (record highs and lows)

Climate data for Mandalay (1981–2010, extremes 1889–present)
Month	Jan	Feb	Mar	Apr	May	Jun	Jul	Aug	Sep	Oct	Nov	Dec	Year
Record high °C (°F)	37.2 (99.0)	39.2 (102.6)	42.8 (109.0)	44.8 (112.6)	45.0 (113.0)	42.0 (107.6)	41.6 (106.9)	39.8 (103.6)	43.4 (110.1)	39.2 (102.6)	38.5 (101.3)	34.5 (94.1)	45.0 (113.0)
Mean daily maximum °C (°F)	29.6 (85.3)	32.7 (90.9)	36.6 (97.9)	38.9 (102.0)	36.9 (98.4)	35.2 (95.4)	35.1 (95.2)	34.3 (93.7)	34.0 (93.2)	33.4 (92.1)	31.1 (88.0)	29.1 (84.4)	33.9 (93.0)
Daily mean °C (°F)	21.9 (71.4)	24.4 (75.9)	28.8 (83.8)	31.9 (89.4)	31.3 (88.3)	30.8 (87.4)	30.8 (87.4)	30.2 (86.4)	29.7 (85.5)	28.8 (83.8)	25.7 (78.3)	22.2 (72.0)	28.0 (82.4)
Mean daily minimum °C (°F)	13.7 (56.7)	16.0 (60.8)	20.4 (68.7)	24.7 (76.5)	25.9 (78.6)	26.1 (79.0)	26.2 (79.2)	25.8 (78.4)	25.4 (77.7)	24.0 (75.2)	19.9 (67.8)	15.4 (59.7)	22.0 (71.6)
Record low °C (°F)	8.0 (46.4)	10.0 (50.0)	12.8 (55.0)	13.0 (55.4)	17.4 (63.3)	20.0 (68.0)	20.0 (68.0)	19.5 (67.1)	20.5 (68.9)	18.5 (65.3)	11.1 (52.0)	7.6 (45.7)	7.6 (45.7)
Average rainfall mm (inches)	0.9 (0.04)	3.8 (0.15)	5.8 (0.23)	40.4 (1.59)	130.0 (5.12)	99.5 (3.92)	74.7 (2.94)	132.9 (5.23)	157.1 (6.19)	130.7 (5.15)	36.4 (1.43)	4.9 (0.19)	817.1 (32.17)
Average rainy days	0.4	0.4	0.4	3.3	8.3	7.2	5.9	8.7	8.1	6.8	2.8	0.7	53.0
Average relative humidity (%)	68	58	49	50	66	73	71	76	76	77	74	72	68
Mean monthly sunshine hours	309	280	301	291	267	208	182	168	215	223	269	278	2,991
Source 1: Norwegian Meteorological Institute (average high and average low, and rainfall 1981–2010), World Meteoroglogical Organization (rainy days 1961–1990), Deutscher Wetterdienst (mean temperatures 1991–2010)
Source 2: Danish Meteorological Institute (sun and relative humidity, 1931–1960), Meteo Climat (record highs and lows),

== Cityscape ==
=== Around the city ===
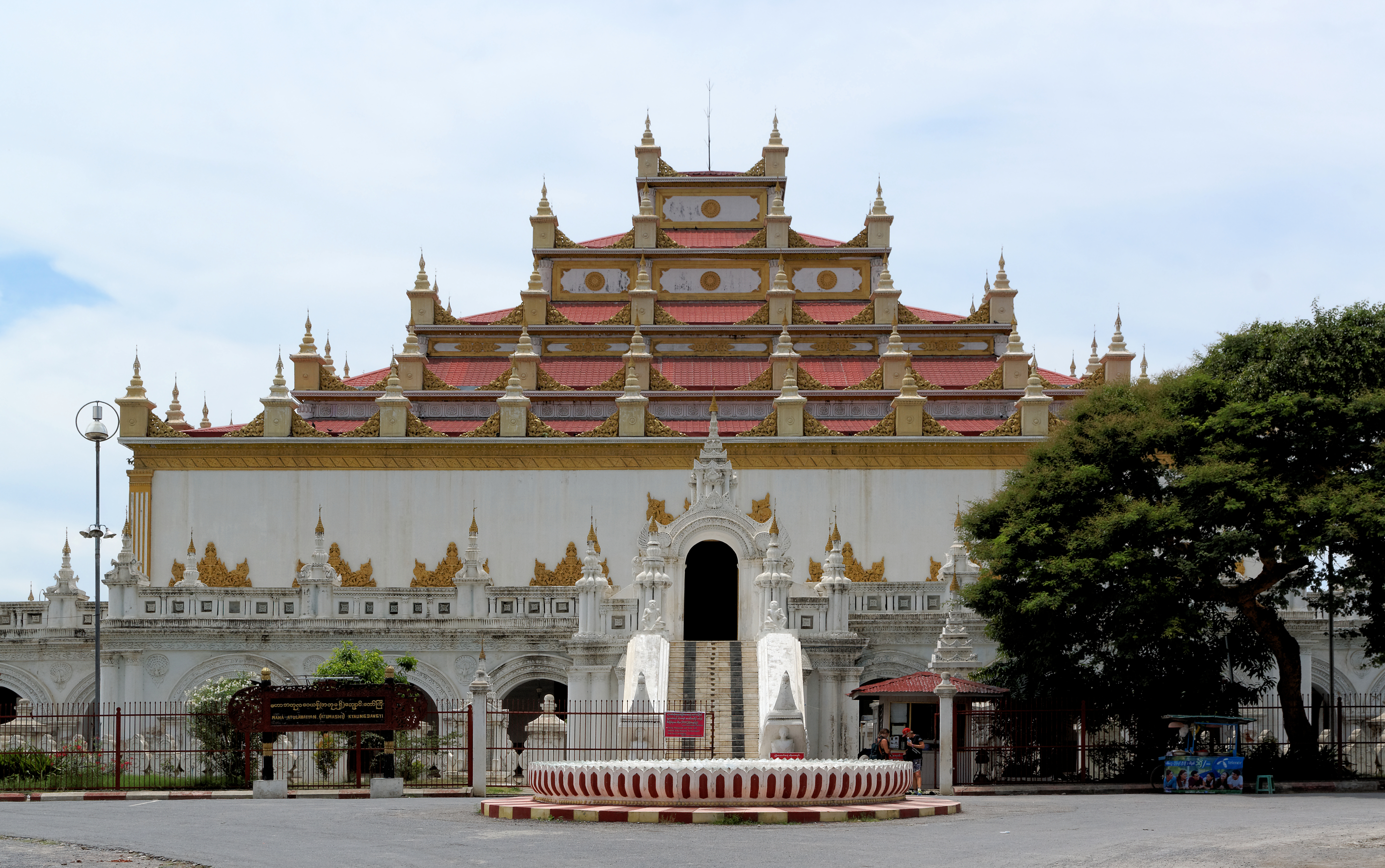
Atumashi Monastery has been rebuilt as a faithful replica of the original destroyed by a fire.

- Atumashi Monastery: The "Atumashi kyaung", which literally means 'inimitable vihara', is also one of the well known sights. The original structure was destroyed by a fire in 1890 though the masonry plinth survived. The reconstruction project was started by the government on 2 May 1995 and completed in June 1996.
- Buddha's Replica Tooth Relic Pagoda: One of the Buddha's Sacred Replica Tooth Relics was enshrined in the Mandalay Swedaw Pagoda on Maha Dhammayanthi Hill in Amarapura Township. The pagoda was built with cash donations contributed by the peoples of Burma and Buddhist donors from around the world under the supervision of the State Peace and Development Council. The authorities and donors hoisted Buddha's Replica Tooth Relic Pagoda Mandalay's Shwe Htidaw (sacred golden umbrella), Hngetmyatnadaw (sacred bird perch vane) and Seinhpudaw (sacred diamond bud) on 13 December 1996.
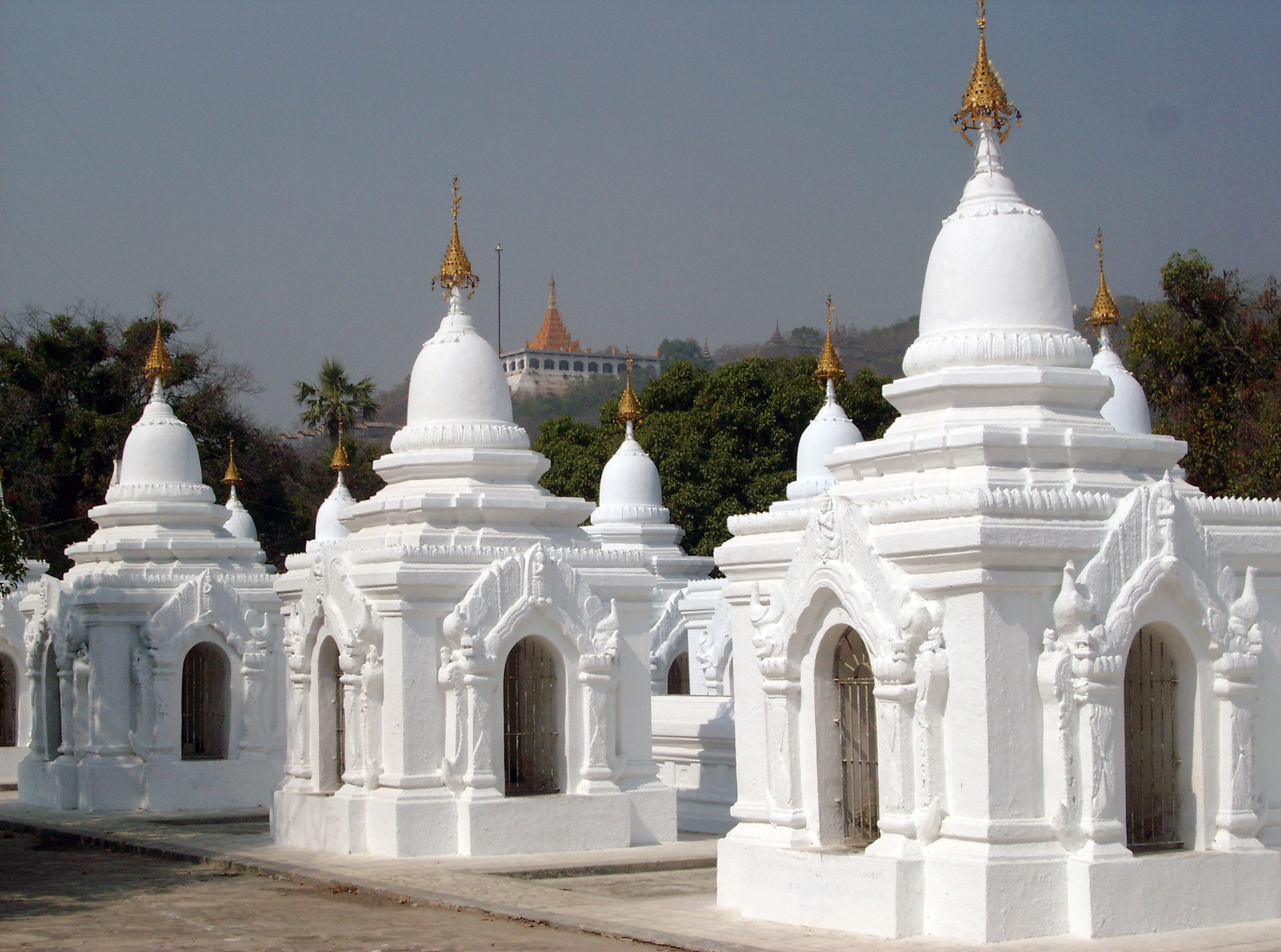
  Kuthodaw Pagoda – Some of the 729 stupas known as the world's largest book
- Kuthodaw Pagoda (The World's Biggest Book): Built by King Mindon in 1857, this pagoda modeled on the Shwezigon Pagoda at Nyaung-U, is surrounded by 729 upright stone slabs on which are inscribed the entire Tipiṭaka as edited and approved by the Fifth Buddhist council. It is popularly known as the world's largest book for its stone scriptures.
- Kyauktawgyi Pagoda: Near the southern approach to Mandalay Hill stands the Kyauktawgyi Buddha image built by King Mindon in 1853–78. The Image was carved out of a huge single block of marble. Statues of 80 arahants are assembled around the Image, twenty on each side. The carving was completed in 1865.
- Mahamuni Buddha Temple: The image of Gautama Buddha at Mahamuni Buddha Temple is said to have been cast in the life-time of the Gautama Buddha and that the Buddha embraced it seven times, thereby bringing it to life. Consequently, devout Buddhists hold it to be alive and refer to it as the Mahamuni Sacred Living Image. Revered as the holiest pagoda in Mandalay, It was built by King Bodawpaya in 1784. The image in a sitting posture is 12 feet and 7 inches (3.8 m) high. As the image was brought from Rakhine State, it was also called the Great Rakhine Buddha. The early morning ritual of washing the Face of Buddha Image draws a large crowd of devotees every day.
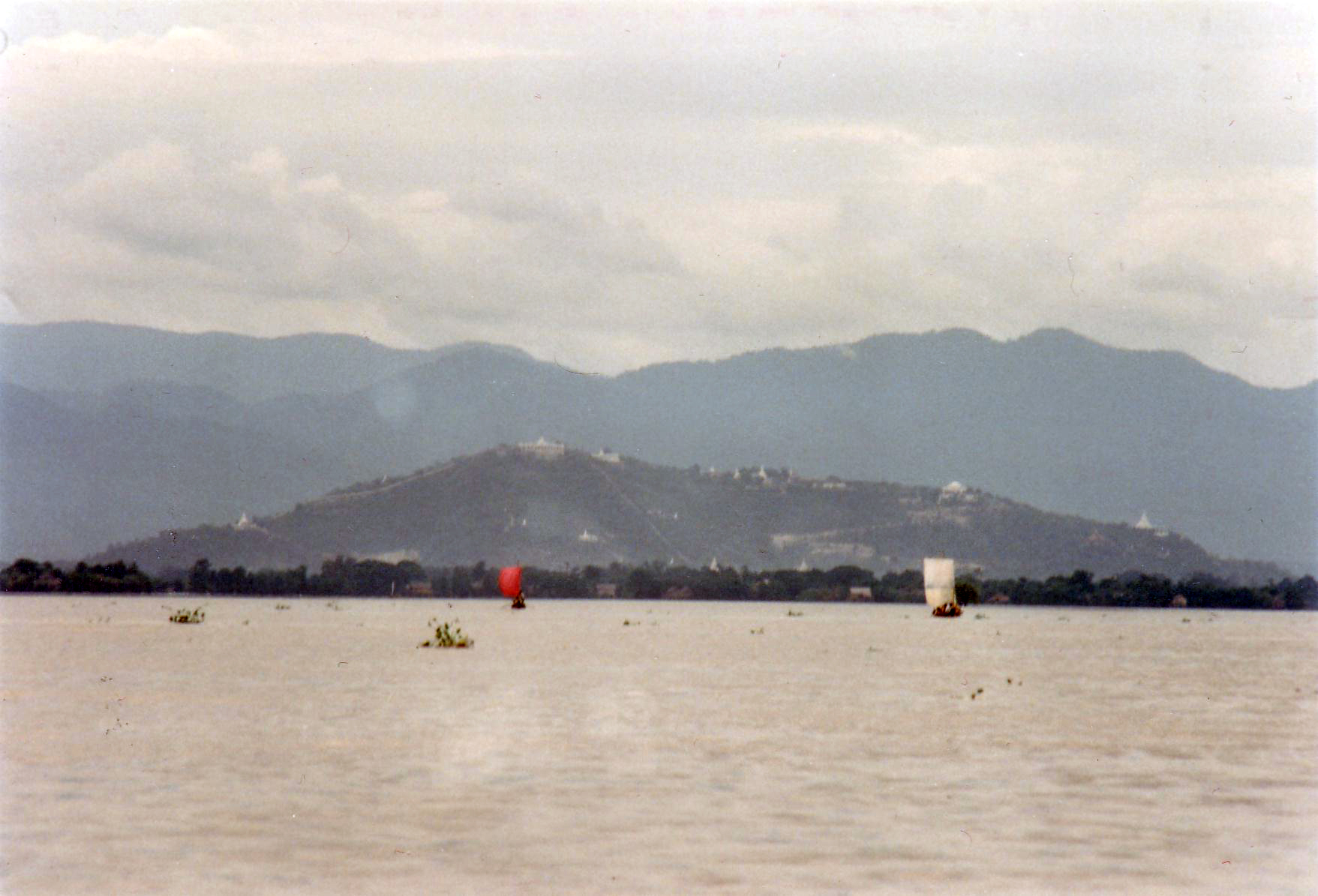
  Mandalay Hill, at 790 ft (240 m), is home to many of Mandalay's religious sites.
- Mandalay Hill: The hill has long been a holy mount. Legend has it that the Buddha, on his visit, had prophesied that a great city would be founded at its foot. Mandalay Hill, 230 metres high, provides a view of the city and the surrounding countryside. The construction of a motor road to reach the hill-top has already been finished.
- Mandalay Palace: The whole palace complex was destroyed by a fire during World War II. The palace walls, the city gates with their crowning wooden pavilions and the surrounding moat, "Mya-nan-san-kyaw Shwenandaw", were rebuilt using forced labor. A model of the Mandalay Palace, Nanmyint-saung and Mandalay Cultural Museum are located inside the palace grounds.

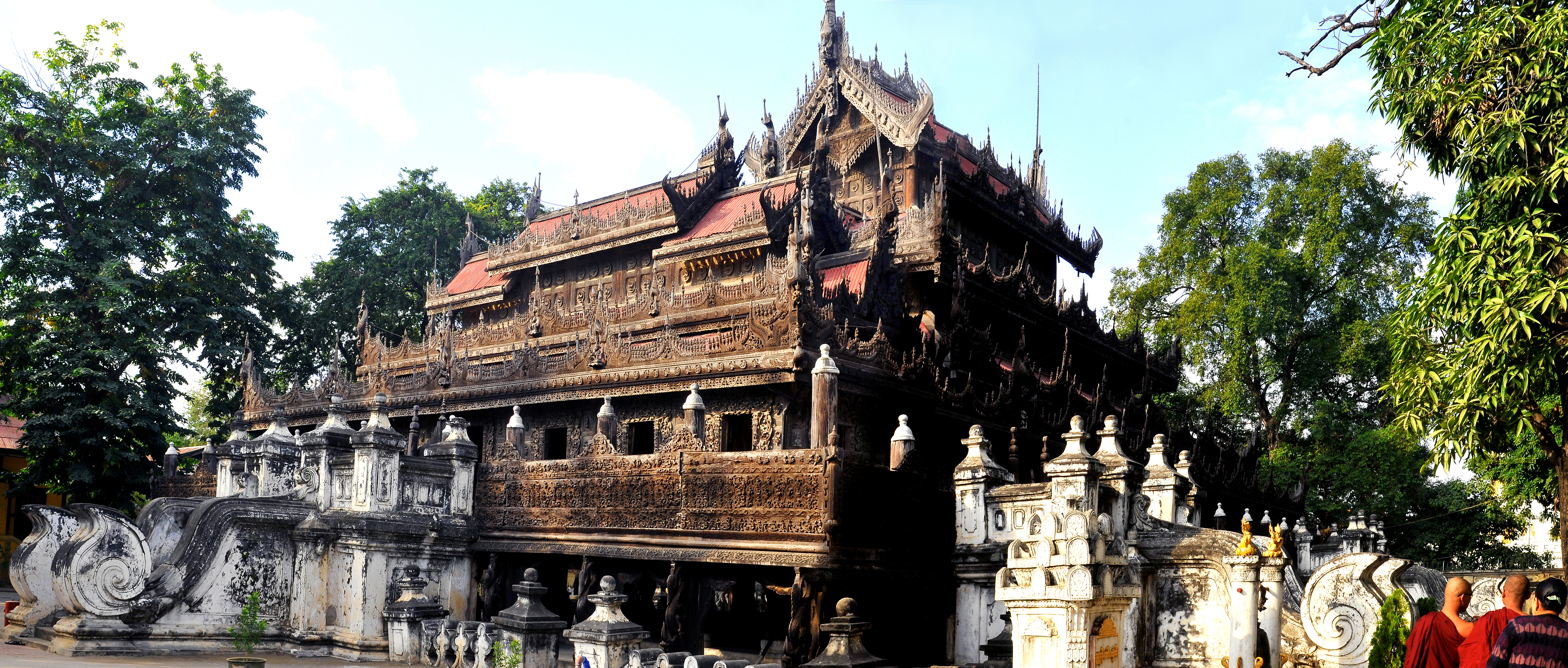
Shwenandaw Monastery

- Shwenandaw Monastery: known for its wood carvings, it was a part of the old palace. In 1880 it was moved by King Thibaw to its current site close to Atumashi Monastery.
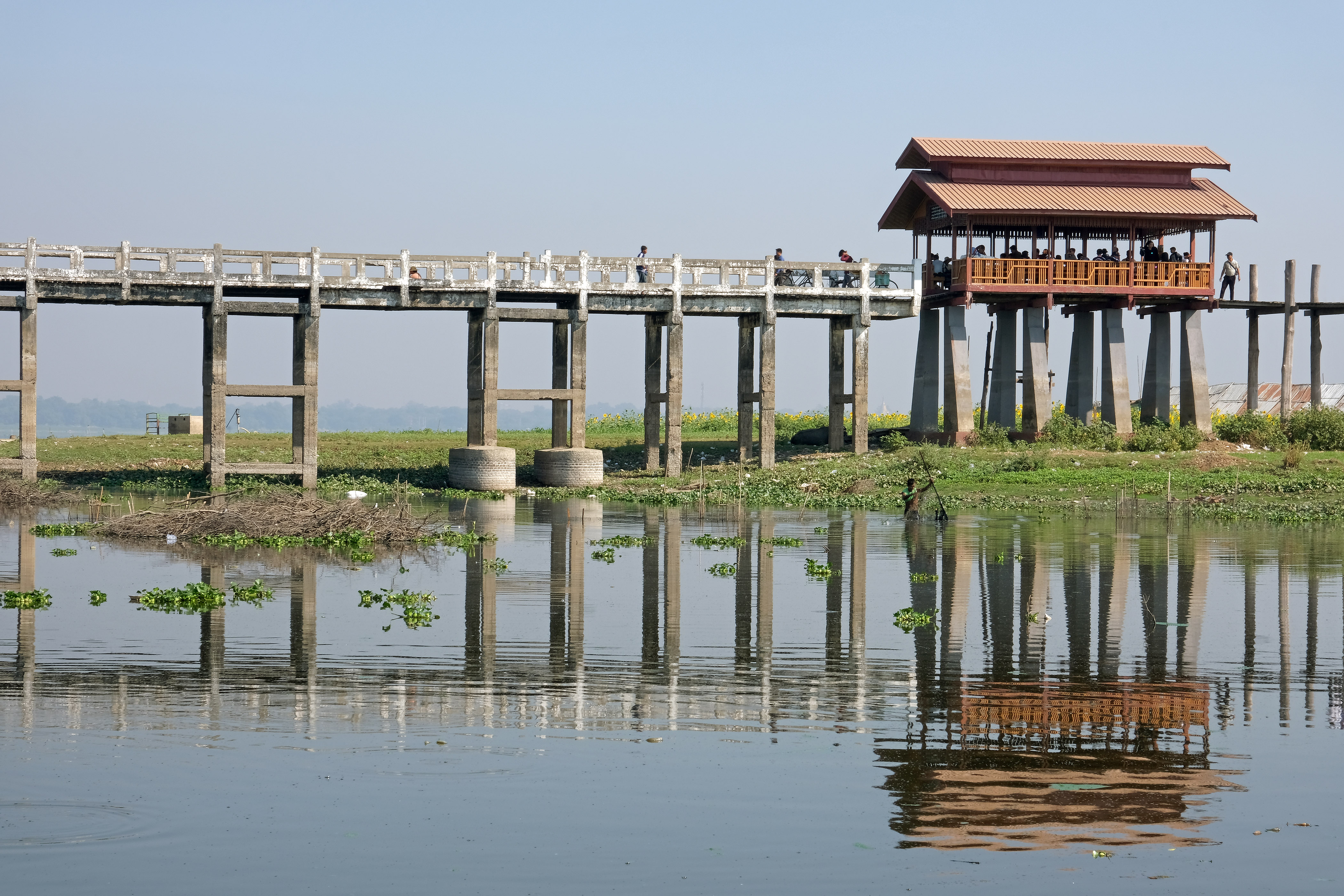
  U Bein Bridge
- U Bein Bridge: known for the oldest and once longest teakwood bridge in the world. It was constructed when the capital of Ava Kingdom moved to Amarapura.
- Yadanabon Zoological Gardens: A small zoo between the Mandalay Palace and Mandalay Hill. It has over 300 species and is notably the only zoo to have Burmese roofed turtles.

== Administration ==
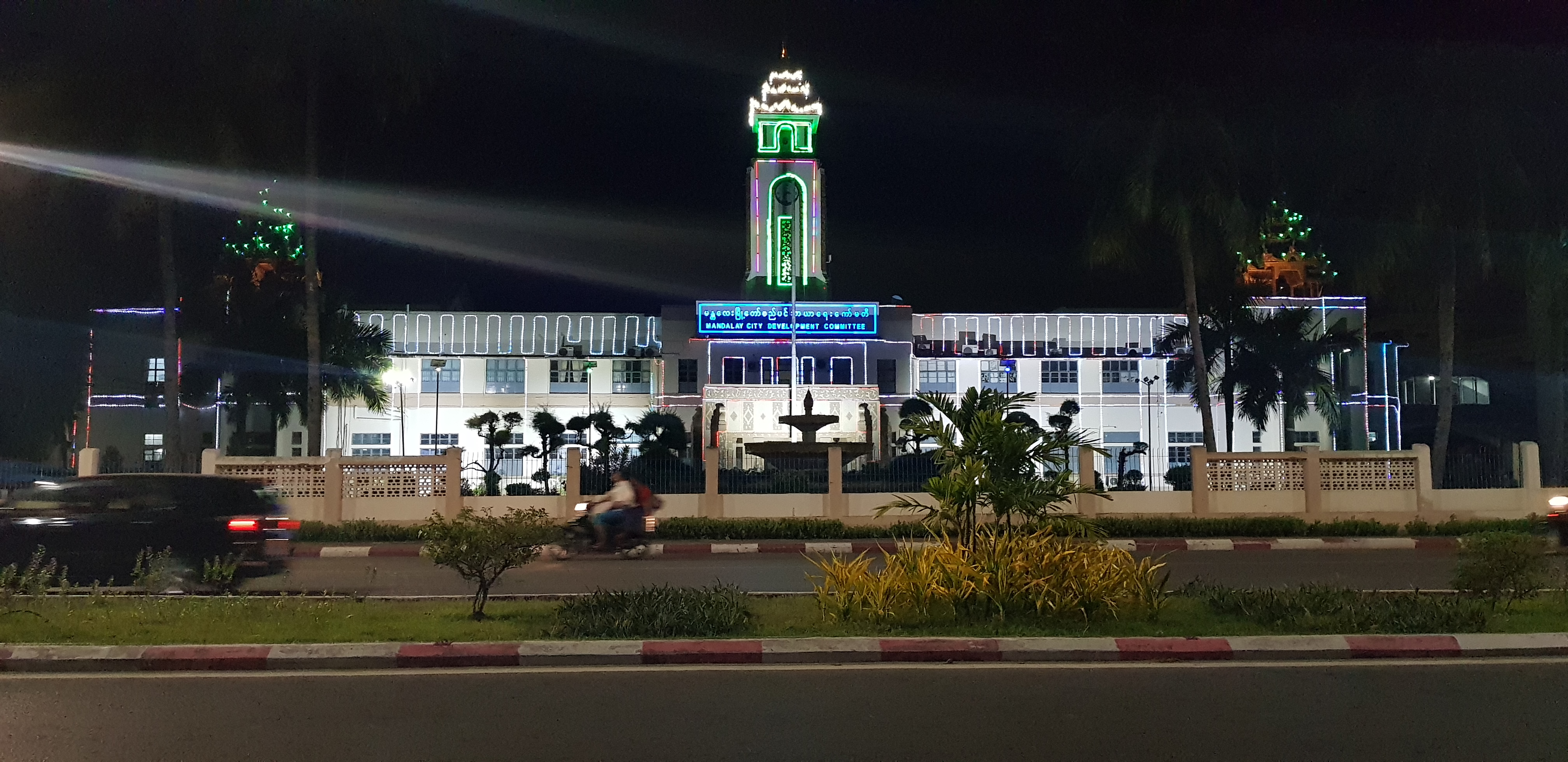
Mandalay City Hall and MCDC Headquarter

The Mandalay Region Government is the government for Mandalay Region including Mandalay City. The Mandalay City Development Committee (MCDC) is municipal organization for Mandalay City. The Mandalay District consists of seven townships.

- Amarapura
- Aungmyethazan
- Chanayethazan (city centre)
- Chanmyathazi
- Maha Aungmye
- Patheingyi
- Pyigyidagun

== Transport ==
Mandalay's strategic location in Central Burma makes it an important hub for transport of people and goods. The city is connected to other parts of the country and to China and India by multiple modes of transportation.

=== Air ===
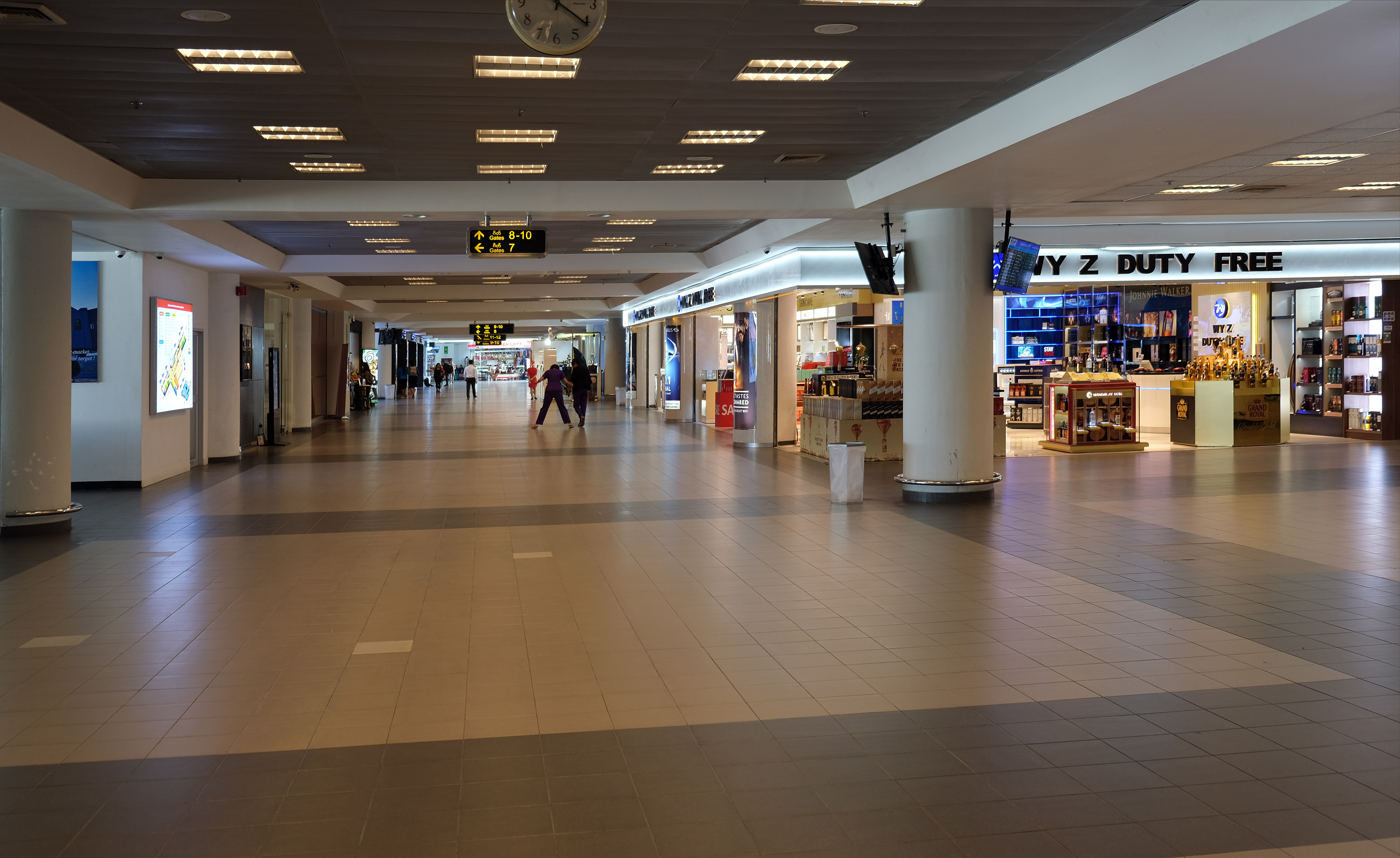
Mandalay International Airport

Mandalay International Airport (MDL) was one of the largest and most modern airports in Myanmar until the modernization of Yangon International Airport in 2008. Built at a cost of US$150 million in 2000, it is highly underused; it serves mostly domestic flights with the exception of those to Kunming and to/from Bangkok and Chiang Mai, with daily flights on Air Asia and Bangkok Airways. The airport has come to represent the military regime's propensity for bad planning and penchant for white elephant projects. Myanmar's recent opening stance on tourism means the airport is now receiving a growing number of visitors from Bangkok and Chiang Mai.

The airport is far from the city, 45 km (28 mi) on a modern highway. Before the construction of this airport, Mandalay Chanmyathazi Airport was the main airport of the city. The airport serves some flights to Myanmar towns.

=== River ===
The Ayeyarwady River remains an important arterial route for transporting goods such as farm produce, including rice, beans and pulses, cooking oil, pottery, bamboo and teak.

=== Rail ===
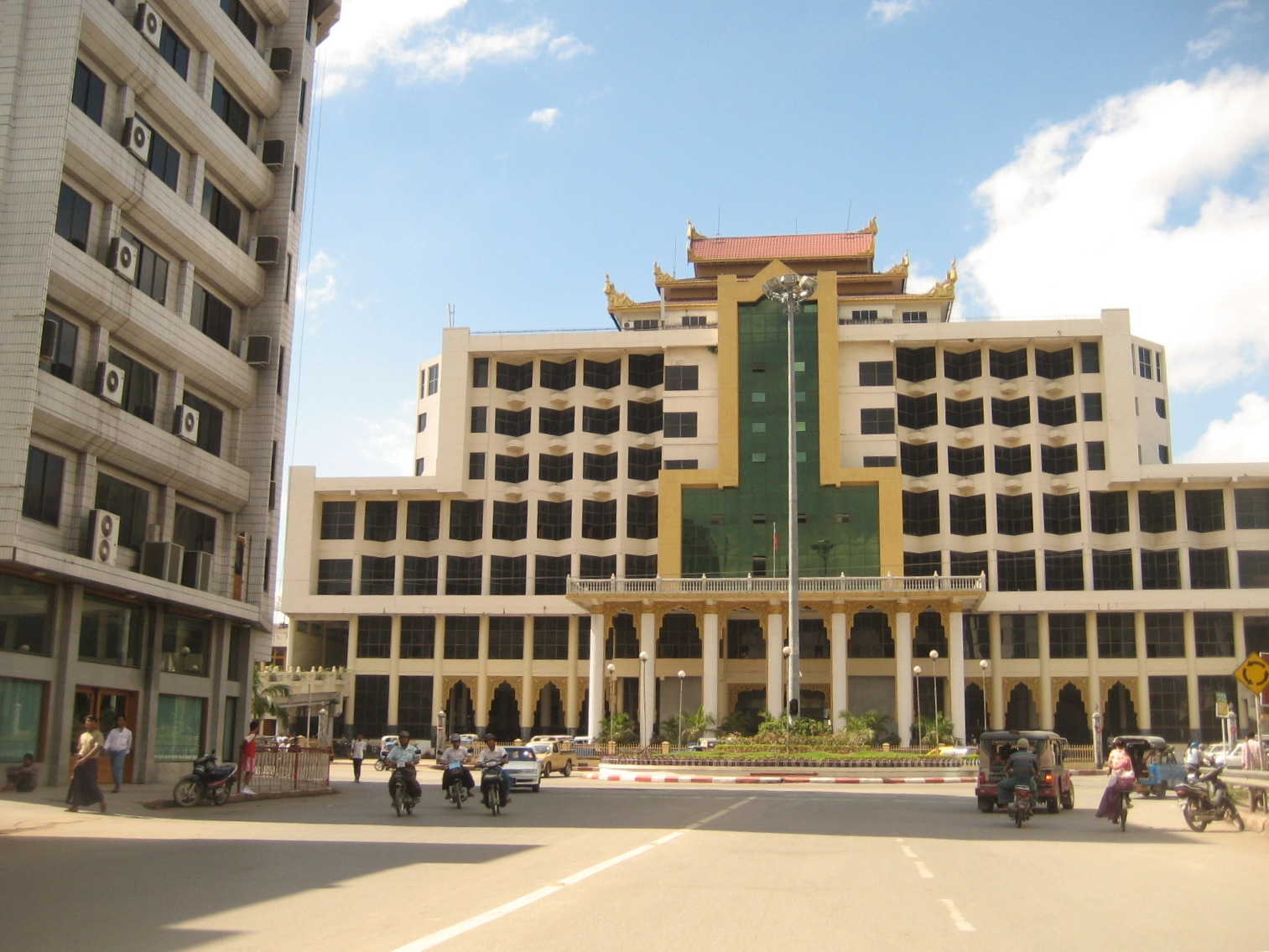
Central Railway Station on 78th and 30th

Mandalay Central Railway Station is the terminus of Myanmar Railways's metre gauge main rail line from Yangon (Yangon–Mandalay Railway) and the starting point of branch lines to Pyin U Lwin (Maymyo), Lashio (Mandalay–Lashio Railway), Monywa, Pakokku, Kalay, Gangaw, and to the north, Shwebo, Kawlin, Naba, Kanbalu, Mohnyin, Hopin, Mogaung and Myitkyina (Mandalay–Myitkyina Railway).

Mandalay is intended to get a station on the projected standard gauge railway from Kunming, China, to the port of Kyaukphyu on the west coast of Myanmar.

Mandalay has no intra-city metro rail system. The former Trams in Mandalay have been decommissioned.

=== Roads ===
Mandalay is at the very center of Burma's road network. The highway network includes roads towards:

- Upper Burma and China—Mandalay–Tagaung–Bhamo–Myitkyina Road, Mandalay–Mogok–Singu–Bhamo Road, Mandalay–Lashio–Muse Road (part of Asian Highway route 14 or AH14)
- Western Burma and India—Mandalay–Sagaing–Monywa–Kalewa–Tamu Road
- Lower Burma– Yangon-Mandalay Expressway and AH1

Most stretches of these highways are one-lane roads in poor condition.

=== Buses and cars ===
As the government allows only a few thousand vehicles to be imported each year, motor transportation in Burma is very expensive for most of its citizens. Most people rely on bicycles, motorcycles and/or private and public buses to get around. Back in the 2000s, the most popular car in Mandalay was the 1982/83 Nissan Sunny pickup truck. Because of its utility as a private bus or taxi, the two-and-a-half-decade old model still had strong demand and heady prices to match—from K10 million to K14 million (US$8,000 to US$11,000) in mid-2008. To get around severe import limits, people in Mandalay had turned to illegally imported and hence unregistered (called 'without' in Myanmar English) motorcycles and cars despite the government's periodic confiscation sprees.

In March 2008, Mandalay had nearly 81,000 registered motor vehicles plus an unknown number of unregistered vehicles. Although the number of cars for a city of one million is low, traffic in Mandalay is highly chaotic as thousands of bicycles and (unregistered) motorbikes freely roam around all the lanes of the streets. Unlike in Yangon, where motorbikes, cycle rickshaws and bicycles are prohibited from entering downtown and busy areas, in Mandalay it is anything goes. In 2018, as part of Mandalay Smart City initiatives, new traffic lights with internet-connected sensors have been installed by the Mandalay City Development Committee to manage traffic at junctions.

== Demographics ==
Historical population
Year	Pop.	±%
1950	167,000	—
1960	250,000	+49.7%
1970	374,000	+49.6%
1980	499,000	+33.4%
1990	636,000	+27.5%
2000	810,000	+27.4%
2007	961,000	+18.6%
2010	1,034,000	+7.6%

A 2007 estimate by the UN puts Mandalay's population at nearly 1 million. The city's population is projected to reach nearly 1.5 million by 2025. While Mandalay has traditionally been the bastion of Bamar (Burman) culture and populace, the massive influx of illegal ethnic Han Chinese in the last 20 years has effectively influenced the ethnic Bamar majority there. Although many ethnic Han Chinese could not get Burmese citizenship, the foreign-born Yunnanese can easily obtain Burmese citizenship cards on the black market. Ludu Daw Amar of Mandalay, the native journalist had said it felt like "an undeclared colony of Yunnan". Today, the percentage of ethnic Han Chinese, estimated at 50% of the city (with the Yunnanese forming an estimated 30% of Mandalay's population), is believed to be nearly the same as that of the ethnic Bamar. A sizable community of Indian immigrants (mostly Tamils) also resides in Mandalay.

Burmese is the principal language of the city, while Chinese is increasingly heard in the city's commerce centers as the second language. English is the third language, known only by some urban people.

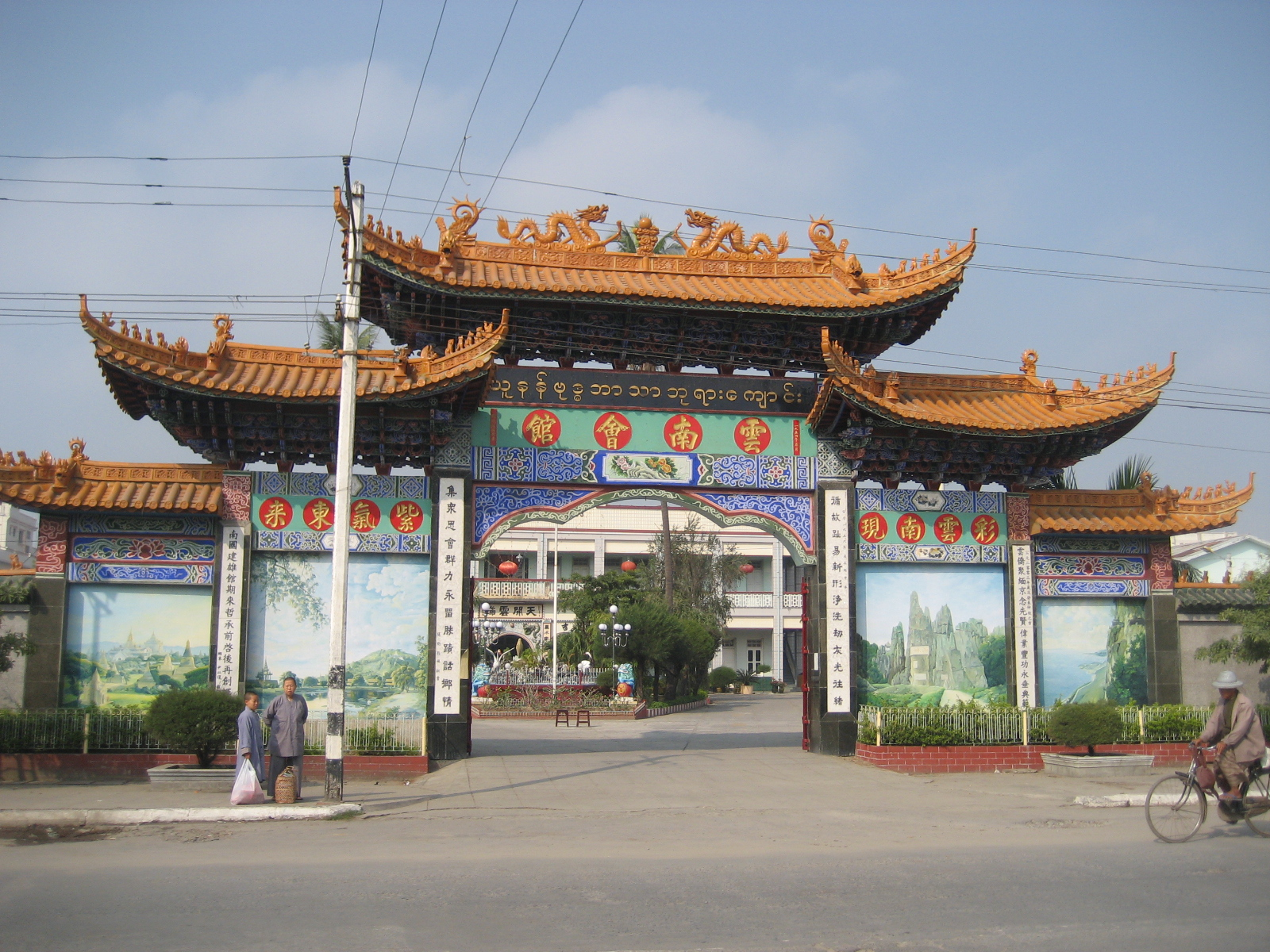
The Yunnanese Buddhist Temple and Association in Mandalay is a major Chinese temple in the city.

Population of Mandalay in 2014

== Culture ==
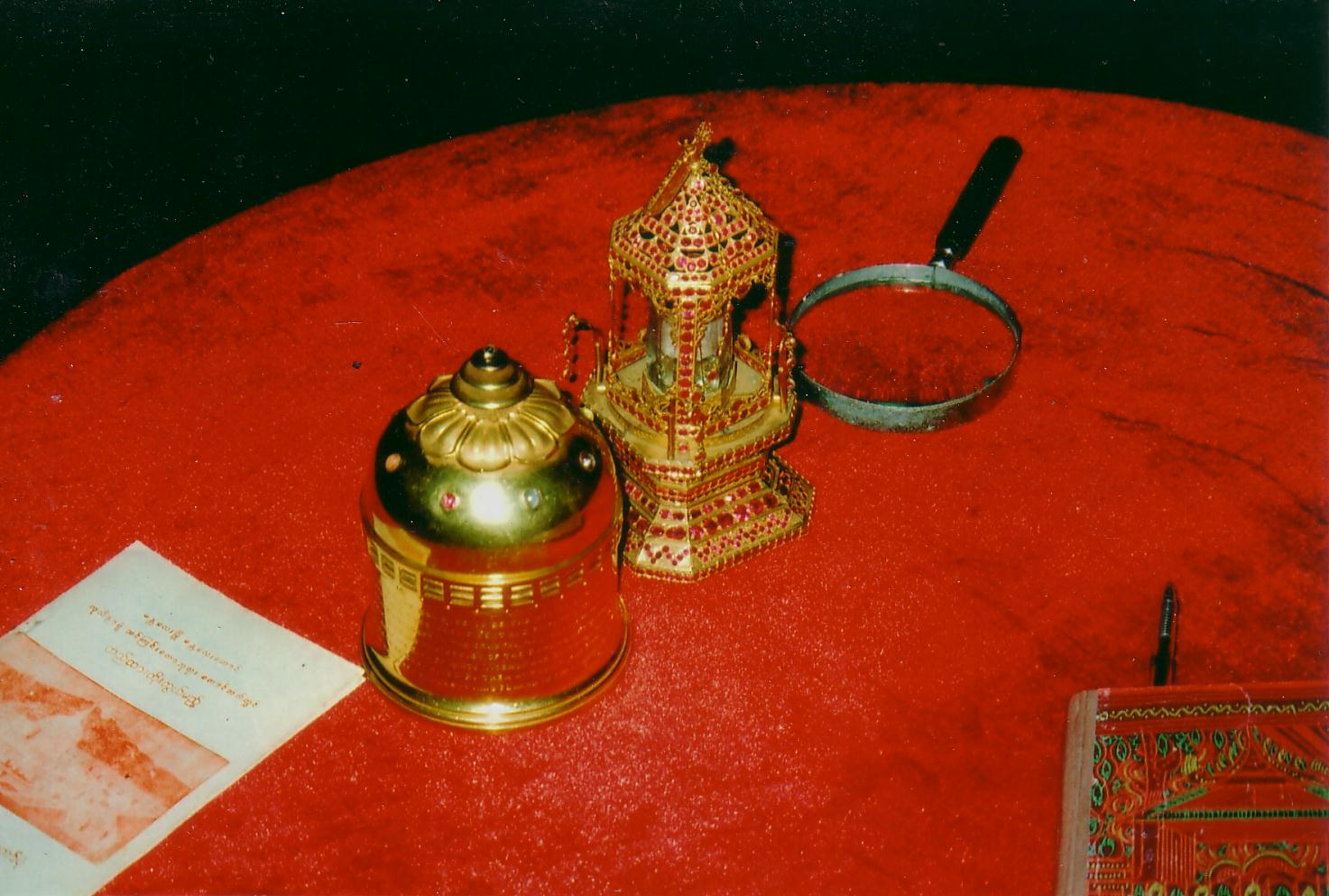
Buddha relics from Kanishka stupa in Peshawar, Pakistan, now in Mandalay. Teresa Merrigan, 2005

Mandalay is Burma's cultural and religious center of Buddhism, having numerous monasteries and more than 700 pagodas. At the foot of Mandalay Hill sits the world's official "Buddhist Bible", also known as the world's largest book, in Kuthodaw Pagoda. The styles of Mandalay Buddha Images and Buddha Statues were many since King Mandon, who was a devout Buddhist, and had filled Mandalay with them and through the years Mandalay Buddhist art became established as the pure art of Myanmar. There are 729 slabs of stone that together are inscribed with the entire Pāli Canon, each housed in its own white stupa.

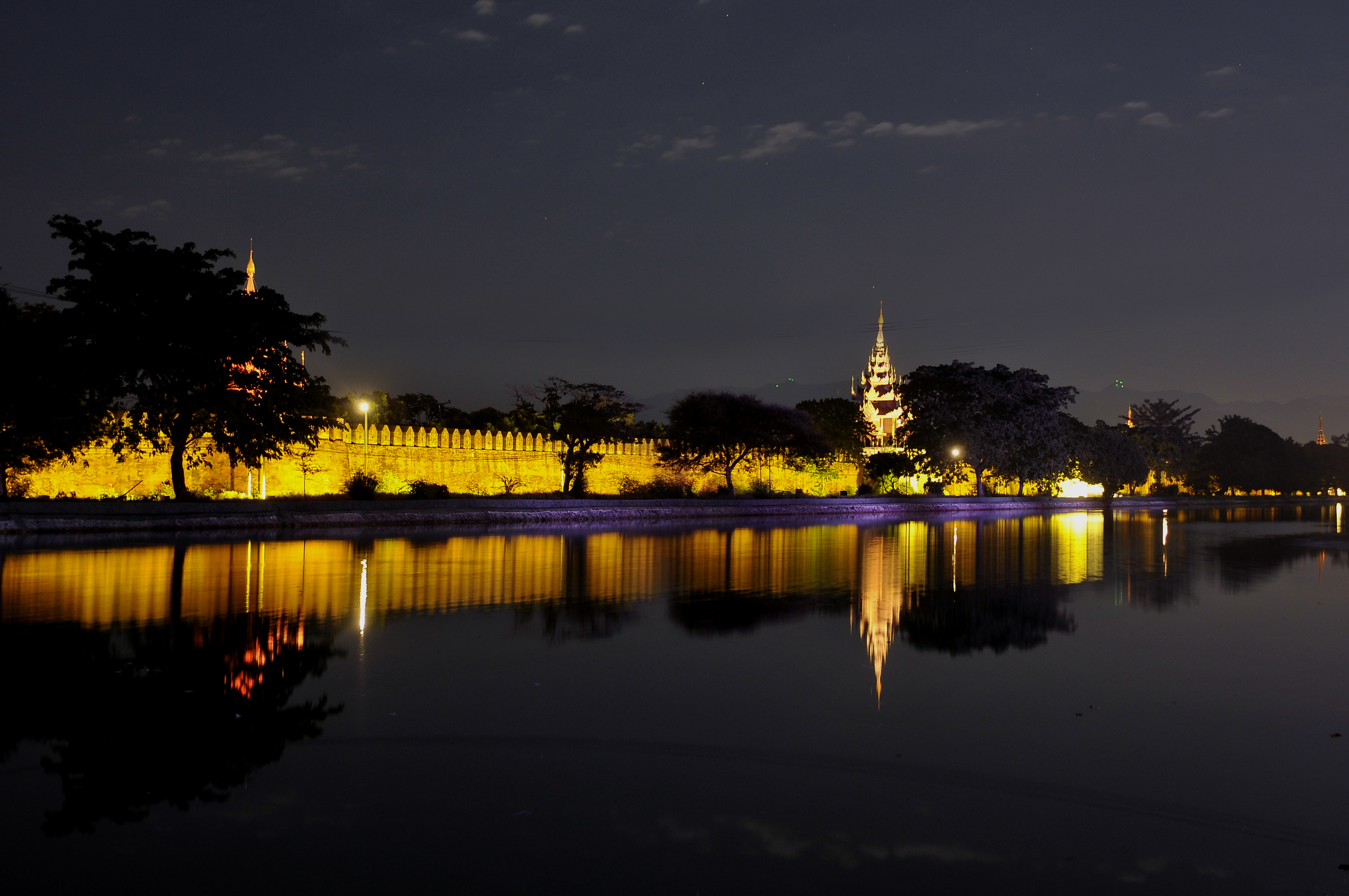
The Mandalay Palace

The buildings inside the old Mandalay city walls, surrounded by a moat, which was repaired in recent times using prison labor, comprise the Mandalay Palace, mostly destroyed during World War II. İt is now replaced by a replica, military Prison and a military garrison, the headquarters of the Central Military Command.

=== Media ===
Much of the media in Mandalay – like elsewhere in Burma – comes from Yangon. The city's non-satellite TV programming comes from Yangon-based state-run TV Myanmar and military-run Myawaddy, both of which provide Burmese-language news and entertainment. Since December 2006, MRTV-4, formerly a paid channel, has also been available in Mandalay. Mandalay has two radio stations. Naypyidaw-based Myanmar Radio National Service is the national radio service and broadcasts mostly in Burmese (and in English during specific times.) Semi-state-run Mandalay City FM (87.9FM) is the Mandalay metropolitan area's pop culture oriented station.

The military government, which controls all daily newspapers in Burma, uses Mandalay to publish and distribute its three national newspapers, the Burmese language Myanmar Alin and Kyemon and the English language New Light of Myanmar. The state-run Yadanabon is published in Mandalay and serves the Upper Burma market. The Mandalay Daily newspaper is published by Mandalay City Development Committee since 30 November 1997.

== Sports ==
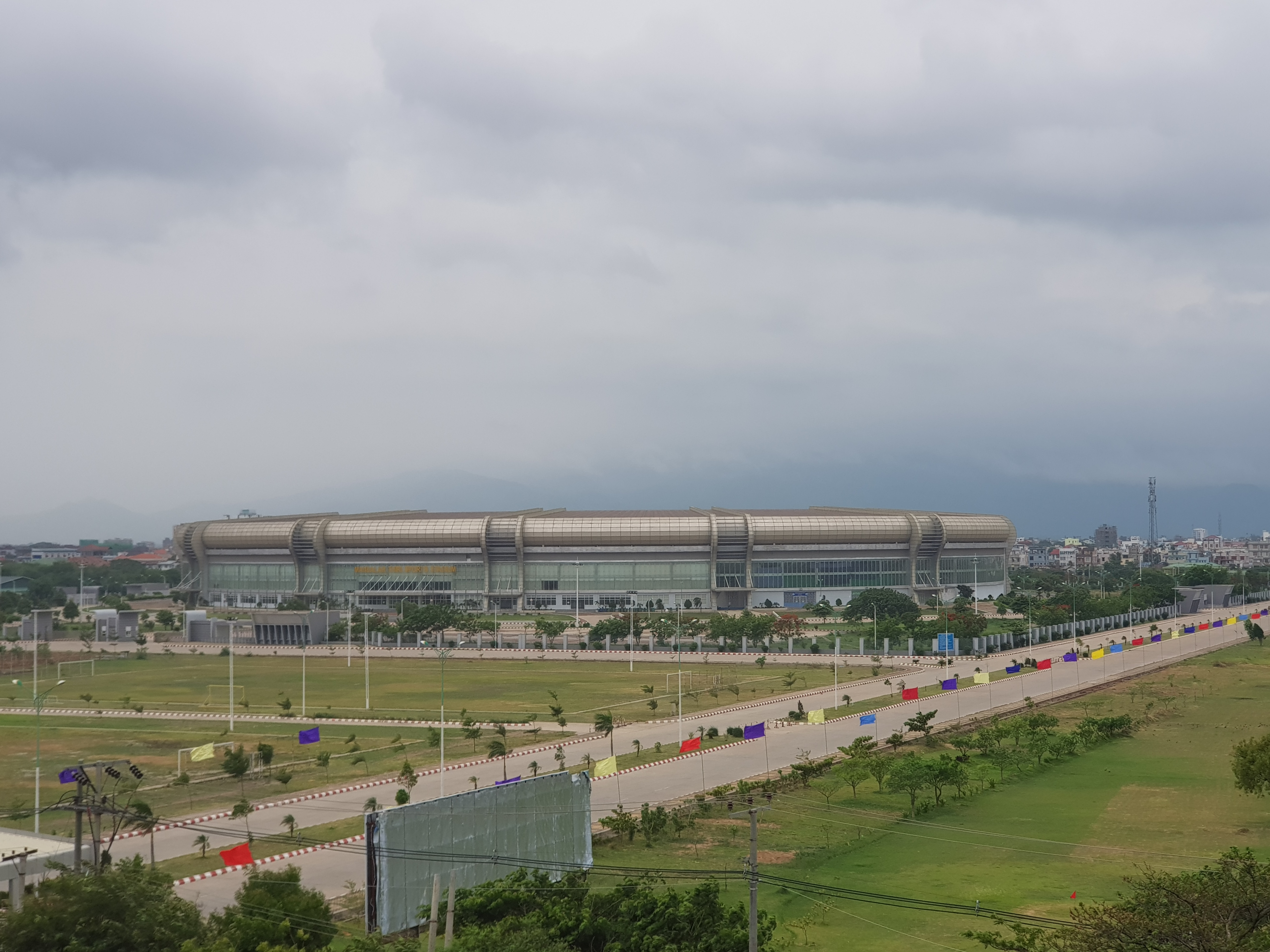
Mandalarthiri Sports Complex

Mandalay's sporting facilities are quite poor by international standards but are still the best in Upper Burma. The 17,000 seat Bahtoo Stadium was the largest in Upper Myanmar before the construction of Mandalarthiri Stadium and hosts mainly local and regional association football and track-and-field tournaments. Since May 2009, professional football has arrived in Mandalay, with Yadanabon FC representing the city in the newly formed Myanmar National League, the country's first professional football league. In 2013, a new stadium, Mandalarthiri Stadium, was built to host the Women Football matches of 27th SEA Games and became the largest stadium in Mandalay and Upper Myanmar.

=== Sport climbing ===
At Waterfall Hill, the first bolted rock climbing site in Myanmar has been developed with the help of Mandalay climbers led by Steve, Tylor and Technical Climbing Club of Myanmar since 2010.

== Economy ==
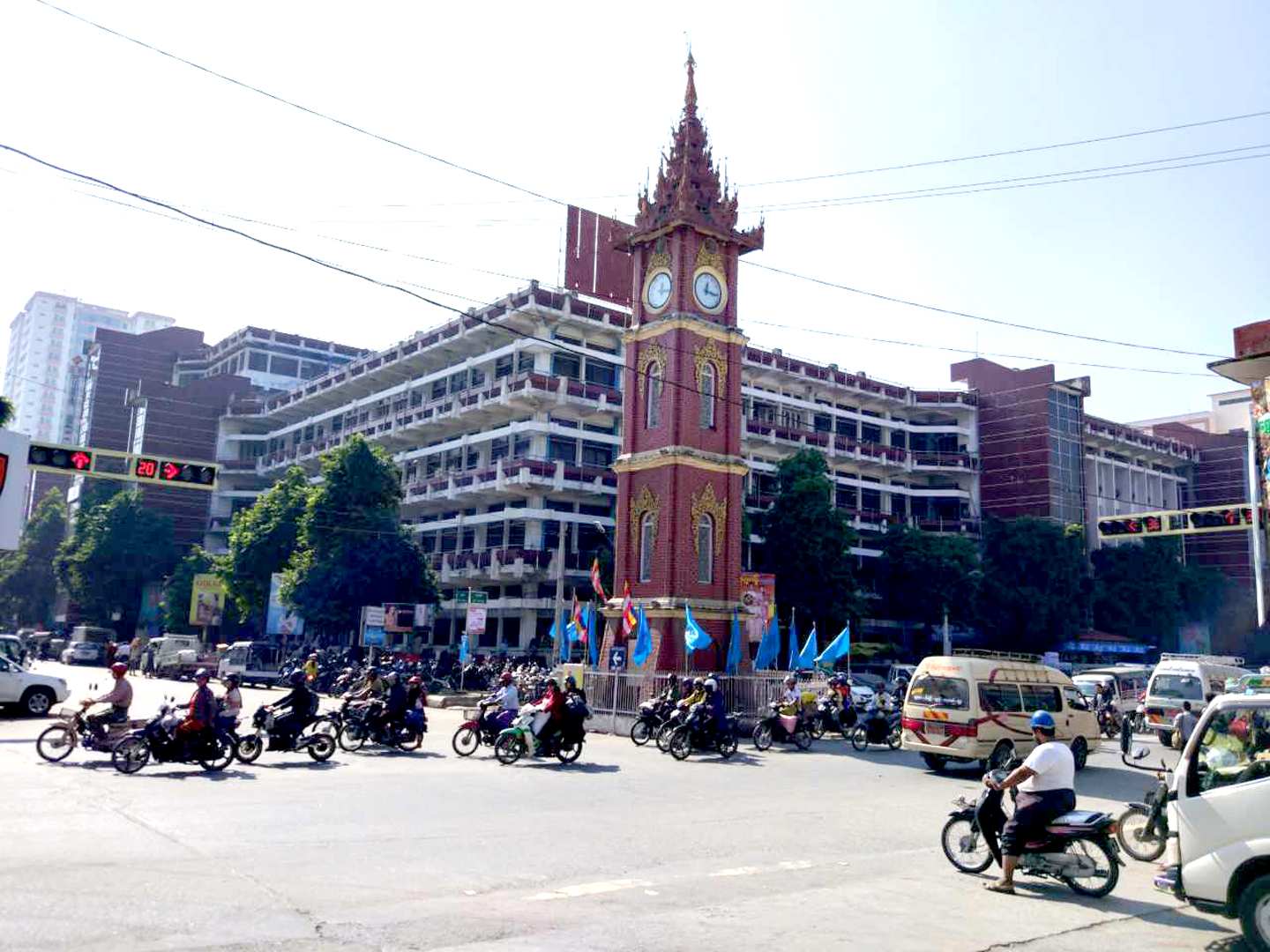
Zaycho market, the biggest market of the city

Mandalay is the major trading and communications center for Upper Myanmar. Much of Burmese external trade to China and India goes through Mandalay.

Among the leading traditional industries are silk weaving, tapestry, jade cutting and polishing, stone and wood carving, making marble and bronze Buddha images, temple ornaments and paraphernalia, the working of gold leaves and of silver, the manufacture of matches, brewing and distilling.

Since the country's post-1988 shift towards economic liberalization, large numbers of Chinese migrants in search of economic opportunity have poured into Mandalay. These migrants brought with them talent, skills, goods and services, and capital, but also purchased most of the shops and real estate in the centre of Mandalay, transforming the economic dynamics of the city. This influx of poor Han Chinese immigrants mostly trace their ancestry to the Southwestern Chinese province of Yunnan. Many were able to illegally obtain identity papers on the black market to become naturalized Burmese citizens overnight. Arriving impoverished, they now sit at the helm of the Burmese economy as a prosperous business community. Identity cards allowed the Chinese immigrants to stay indefinitely and bypass legal barriers on foreign ownership of businesses such as hotels, shops, and restaurants.

The imposition of sanctions by the United States and the European Union in the 1990s and Burma's open-door immigration policy in the 1990s encouraged Chinese entrepreneurs to move to Mandalay. A substantial increase in foreign direct investment has poured in from mainland China, mostly ending up in Mandalay's real estate sector, through Burmese citizen intermediaries of Chinese ancestry. Retail outlets were opened by Chinese entrepreneurs, ranging from cement mixing to financial services turning Mandalay into the prosperous business centre it is today. As Mandalay became more economically prosperous, existing Burmese Chinese have facilitated continued immigration from China. The transformation of Mandalay into a booming modern metropolis filled with foreign businesses and gem trading centers occurred under the auspices of the entrepreneurial Chinese minority.

The Chinese minority in Mandalay own virtually all of Mandalay's retail gold shops, mining concessions, foreign businesses and timber trading companies. In Central Mandalay, about 80 percent or four out of five gold and jewellery shops are Chinese-owned. Many Chinese-owned and operated businesses such as trading cooperatives, market stalls, food joints, traditional Chinese medicinal clinics, hotels, gemstone mining concessions, wholesale marketing, hotels, restaurants, and real estate have also flourished. Foreign purchasers of jade and gems flock to the city of Mandalay, with clients from Hong Kong continuing to be the source of main customers. Mandalay has been virtually sinicized economically and culturally, to the resentment of locals. More than 50 percent of the commercial business activity generated in Downtown Mandalay is derived from the eclipsing plethora of Chinese-owned shops, hotels, restaurants, and showrooms that predominate the area. About 80 percent of the hotels and guesthouses, more than 70 percent of the restaurants, more than 45 percent of gold and jewellery shops, about 30 percent of jade and gemstone trading, and nearly 100 percent of the sale centres for mainland Chinese-made commodities in Mandalay are owned and operated by the Chinese. Chinese entrepreneurs and investors have acquired much of Central Mandalay's economic crown jewels and have been disproportionately responsible for generating much of the city's output of commercial business activity relative to their small population size.

Prime residential and commercial real estate in central Mandalay have been bought by wealthy Chinese businessmen and investors. As many as half of the city's residents have Chinese ancestry with the seven of the top ten entrepreneurs in Mandalay being of Chinese descent fully controlling 60 percent of its entire economy. About 50 percent of the land plots in Downtown Mandalay are controlled by the Chinese. In addition, all of Mandalay's shopping malls and hotels were entirely built by Chinese-owned construction and real estate development companies. Besides Mandalay's economic development being shaped by the Burmese Chinese business community's immense development output, it has also been amplified with additional investment from foreign Chinese investment from mainland China and overseas bamboo networks. The apparent influence of mainland China is also ostensibly felt throughout the city, where the local inhabitants have alluded to Mandalay as a "Chinese city" dominated by an inflow of international expatriate mainland and overseas Chinese capital, with much of it invested in real estate, including hotels and restaurants.

Despite the rise of Naypyidaw, the country's capital since 2006, Mandalay remains Upper Burma's main commercial, educational and health center. In October 2018, Mandalay was ranked by CIO Asia as number fifth among the top 10 cities in Southeast Asia in the process of becoming a smart city for ASEAN Smart Cities Network.

Mandalay's other major industries include sports where the nation's popularity of soccer has sprung across the city. The Burmese soccer club, Yadanabon FC represents the city in the Myanmar National League, making it the nation's first professional soccer league.

== Education ==
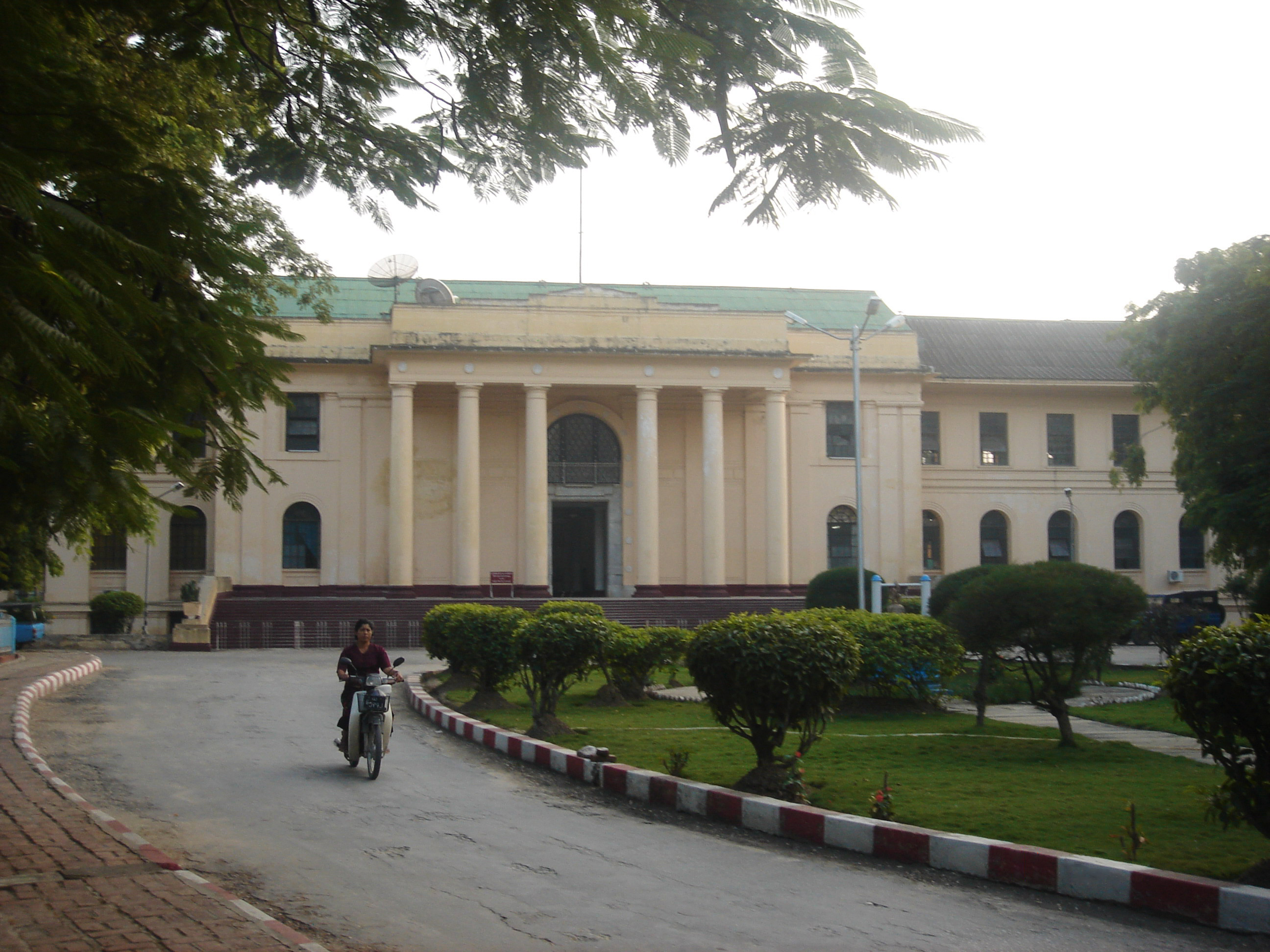
University of Mandalay

Mandalay has the best educational facilities and institutions, after Yangon, in Burma where state spending on education is among the lowest in the world. Students in poor districts routinely drop out in middle school as schools have to rely on forced "donations" and various fees from parents for nearly everything – school maintenance to teachers' salaries. For the rest of the students who cannot afford to go abroad for studies, Mandalay offers Upper Burma's best institutions of higher education. There are over 15 universities in the city. The city's University of Mandalay, University of Medicine, Mandalay, University of Dental Medicine, Mandalay, Mandalay Technological University and University of Computer Studies, Mandalay are among the nation's most selective universities.

== Health care ==
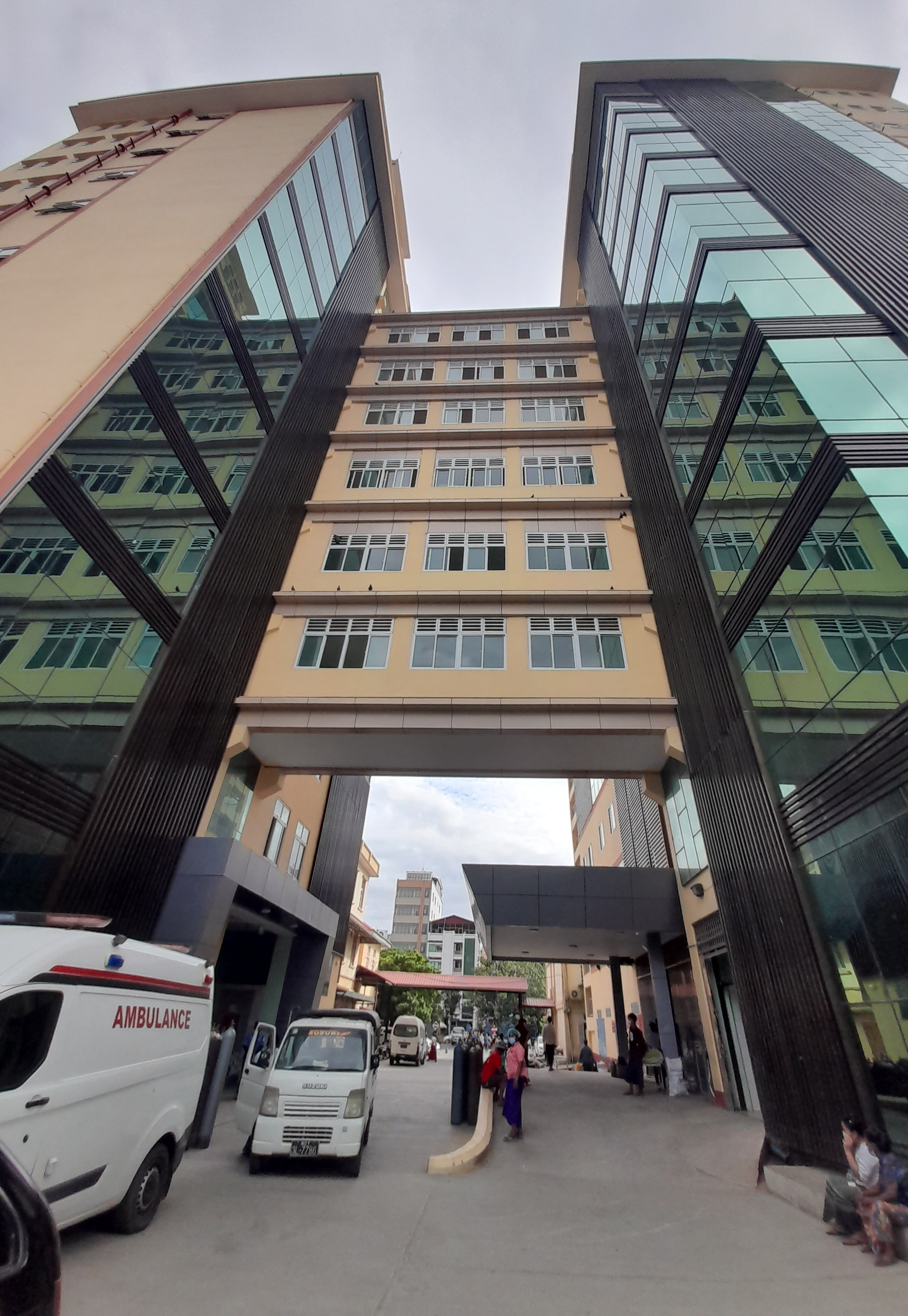
Mandalay General Hospital

The general state of healthcare in Myanmar is poor. The military government spends anywhere from 0.5% to 3% of the country's GDP on health care, consistently ranking among the lowest in the world.

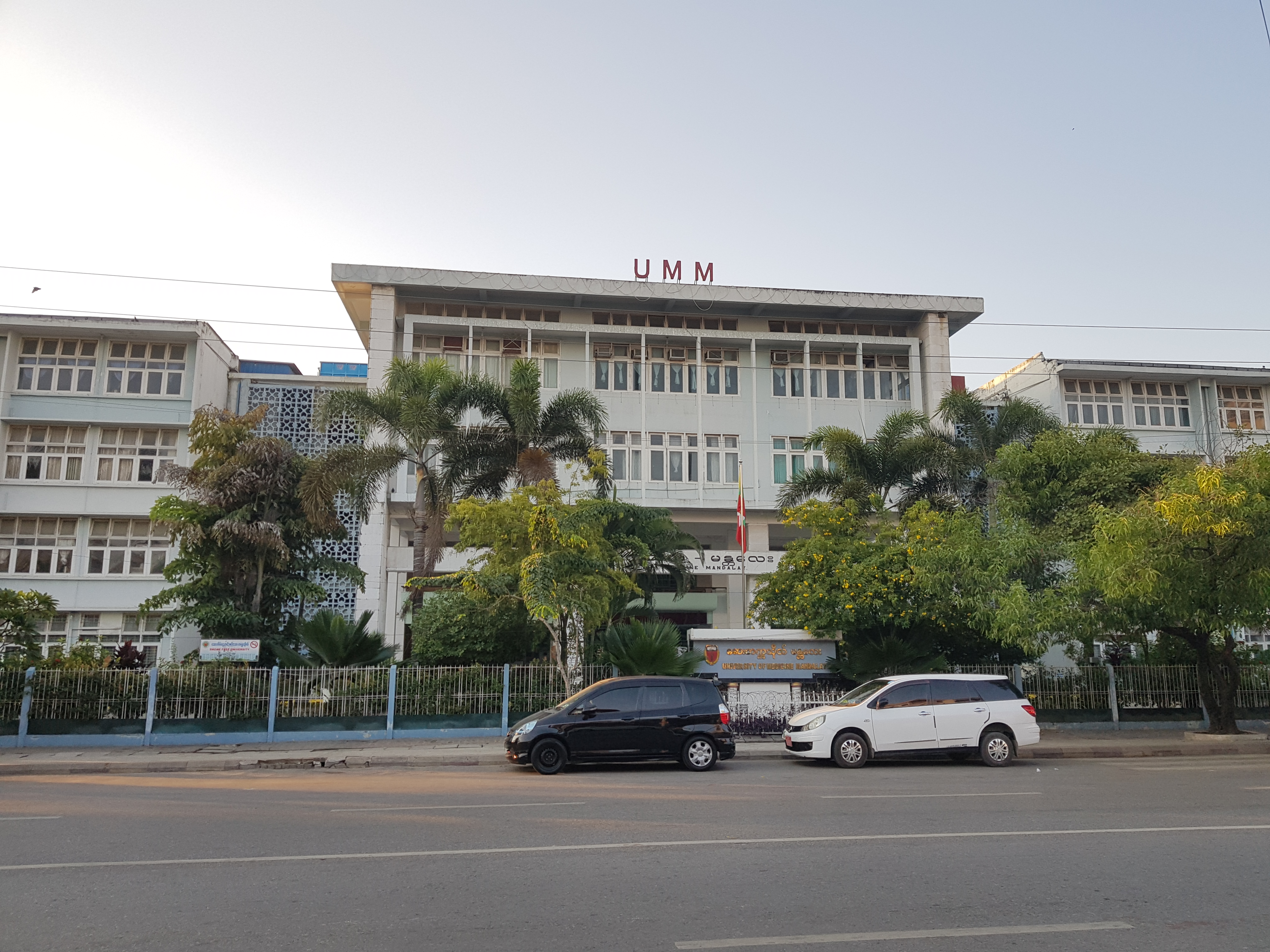
University of Medicine, Mandalay

In 2005, the public health care system of Mandalay Region with over 7.6 million people consisted of slightly over 1000 doctors and about 2000 nurses working in 44 hospitals and 44 health clinics. Over 30 of the so-called hospitals had less than 100 beds. Although health care is nominally free, in reality, patients have to pay for medicine and treatment, even in public clinics and hospitals. Public hospitals lack many of the basic facilities and equipment.

Nonetheless, Mandalay remains the main health care center for Upper Burma as almost all of large public hospitals and private hospitals are in Mandalay. The city has ten public hospitals and one hospital specializing in traditional Burmese medicine. For a semblance of adequate health care, the well-to-do from Upper Burma go to private hospitals and clinics in Mandalay. For more advanced treatments, they have to go to Yangon or abroad. The wealthy Burmese routinely go abroad (usually Bangkok or Singapore) for treatment.

== Twin towns – sister cities ==
Mandalay is twinned with:

- Cirebon, Indonesia
- Kunming, China
- Phnom Penh, Cambodia
- Ulsan, South Korea

== Mandalay in popular culture ==
- Rudyard Kipling wrote a poem called "Mandalay" (1890), which is the origin of the phrase "on the road to Mandalay". In 1907, the poem was set to music by Oley Speaks as On the Road to Mandalay. Speaks' version was widely recorded. Among the best known renditions is the one by Frank Sinatra on Come Fly With Me.
- Bithia Mary Croker wrote a novel in 1917, The Road to Mandalay, which was the uncredited basis for a 1926 American silent film. Of this, only excerpts survive. A further film of the same name was directed by Midi Z in 2016.
- The large hotel/casino/convention center Mandalay Bay in Las Vegas is named for the city, despite the fact that the city is 500 kilometers from the nearest bay, perhaps in reference to the line in Kipling's poem, "An' the dawn comes up like thunder outer China 'crost the Bay! "
- George Orwell was stationed at Mandalay for a time while working for the Indian Imperial Police in Burma, and his first novel, Burmese Days (1934), was based on his experiences in Burma. He also wrote a number of short non-fiction essays and short stories about Burma, such as "A Hanging" (1931) and "Shooting an Elephant" (1936).
- John Masters wrote a book about his wartime experiences in Burma called The Road Past Mandalay (1961)..
- In the 1956 children's song "Nellie the Elephant", the road to Mandalay is the location for a rendezvous of the herd:

The head of the herd was calling far far away.
They met one night in the silver light,
On the road to Mandalay.

- The American film studio Mandalay Pictures is named after the city. The logo also features a tiger, which is often seen roaming around the city.
- British pop singer Robbie Williams sang a song called The Road to Mandalay which was released as a single in 2001.
- The album Ghost of a Rose from Renaissance folk-rock band Blackmore's Night begins with the song "Way to Mandalay."

== Notable people ==
- Saw Maung (1928–1997), Burmese general, chairman of State Law and Order Restoration Council
- Oo Zun (1868–1944), social worker and Buddhist nun
- Zwe Ohn Chein (1910–1979), Burmese inventor and writer

== Gallery ==
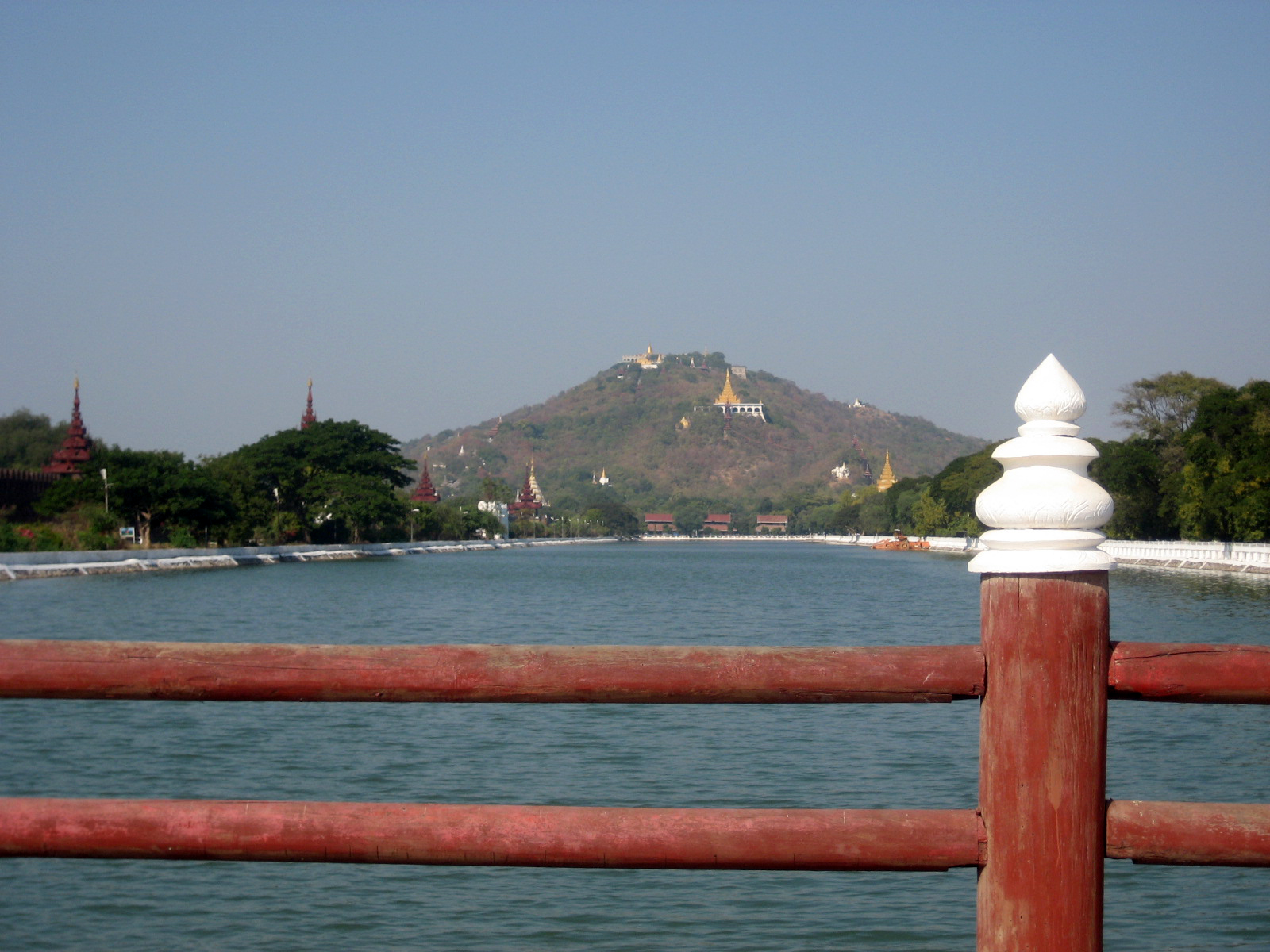
Mandalay Hill

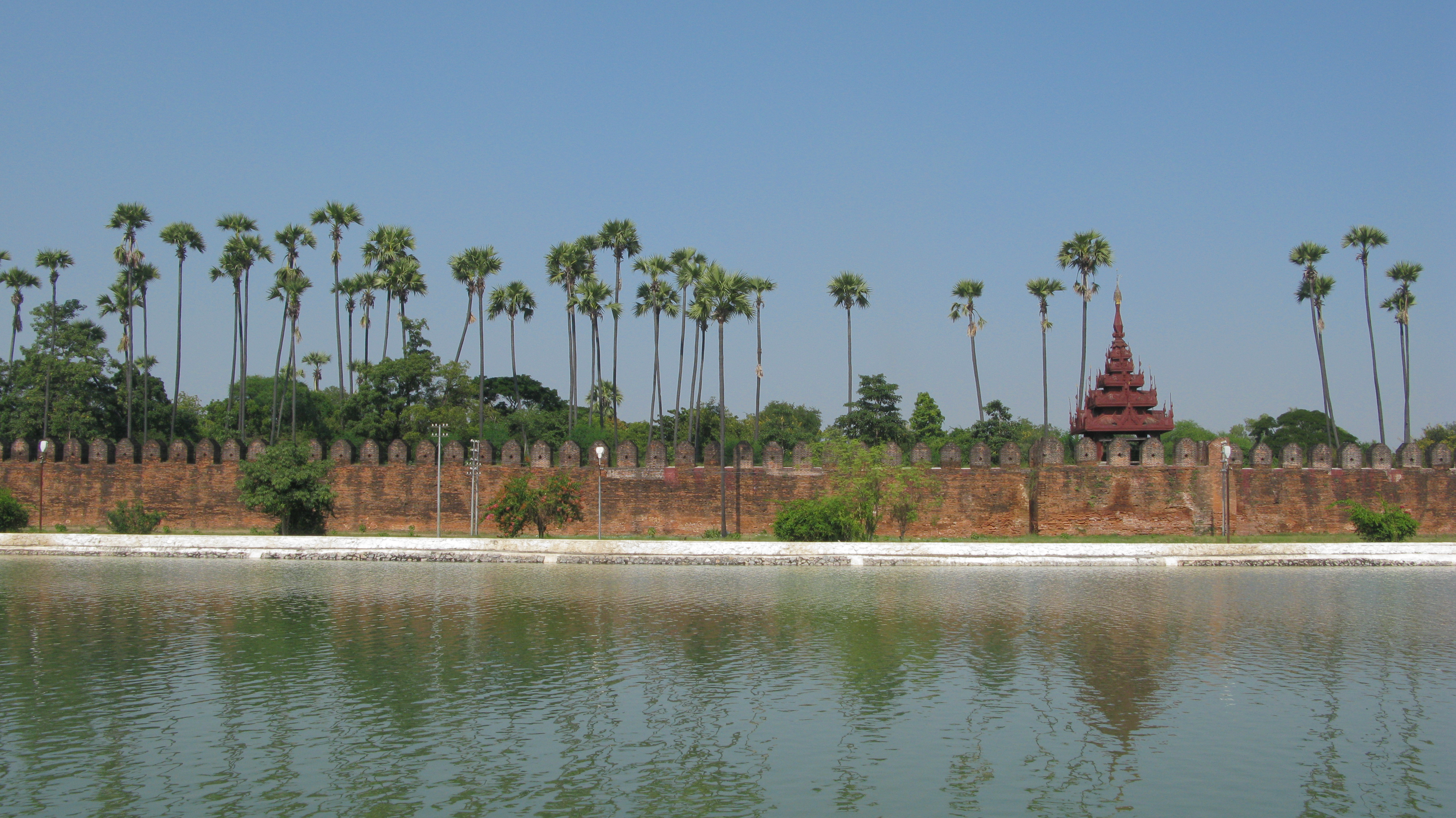
Moat

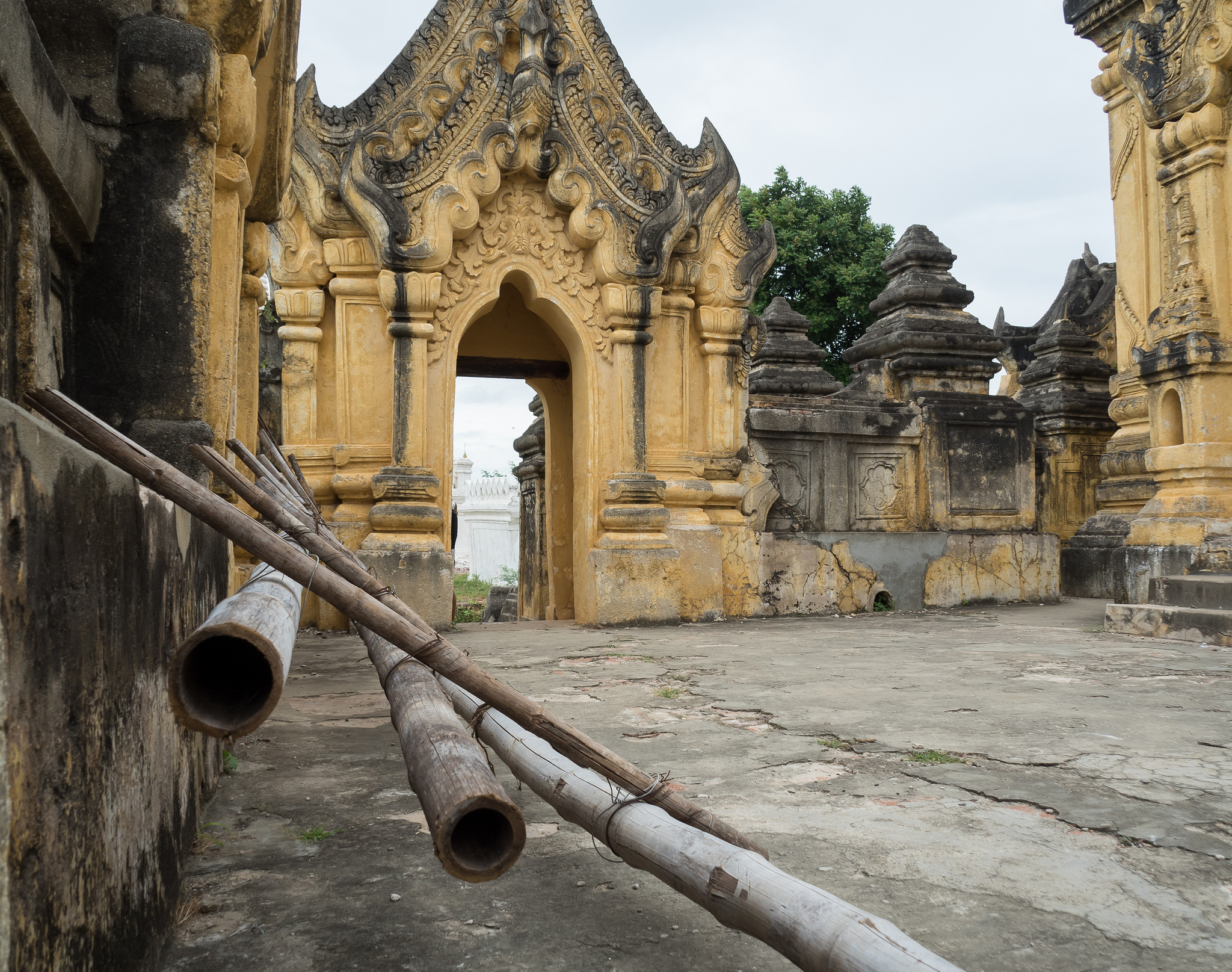
Maha Aungmye Bonzan Monastery in Inwa

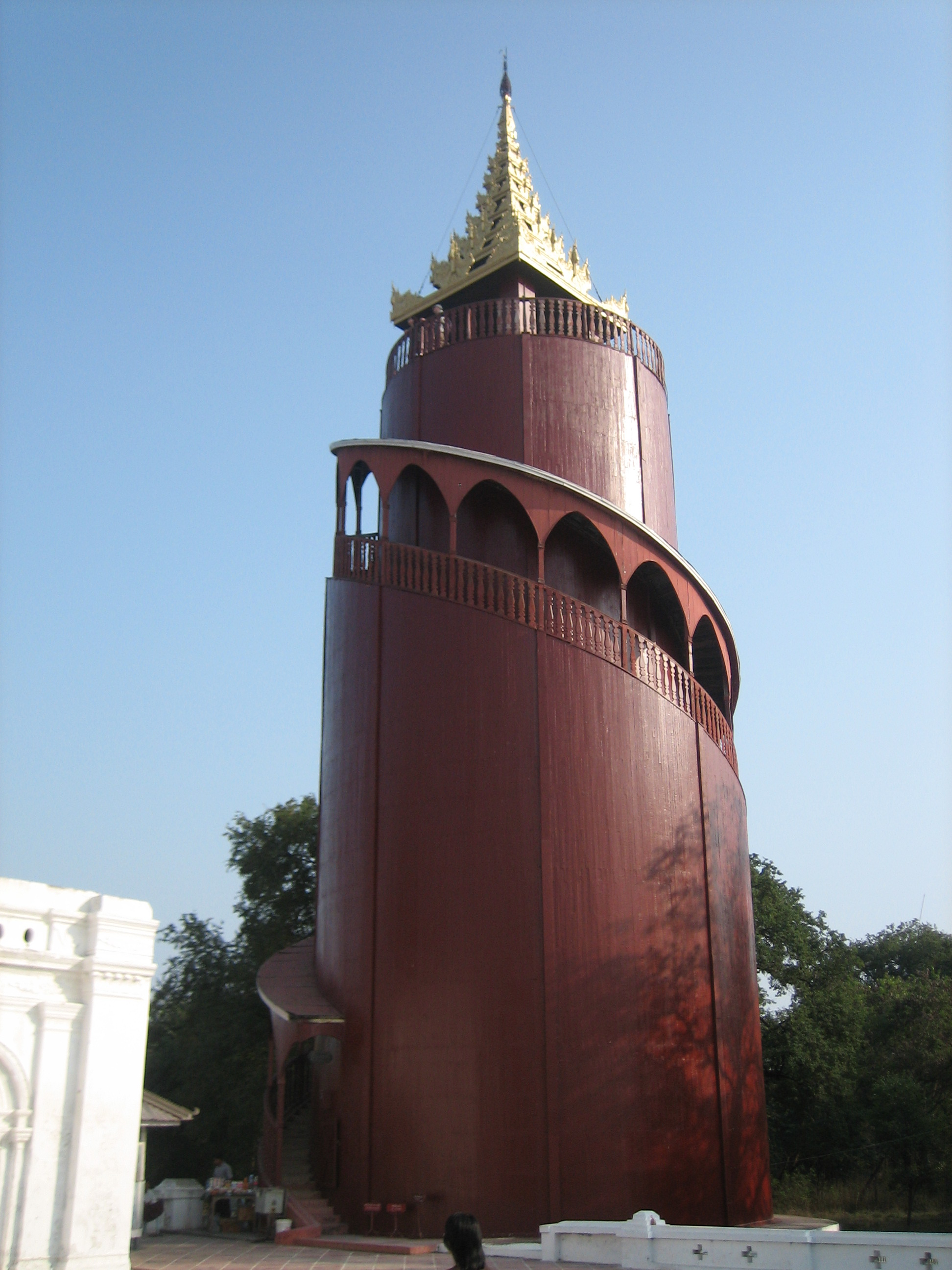
Mandalay Palace Watch Tower

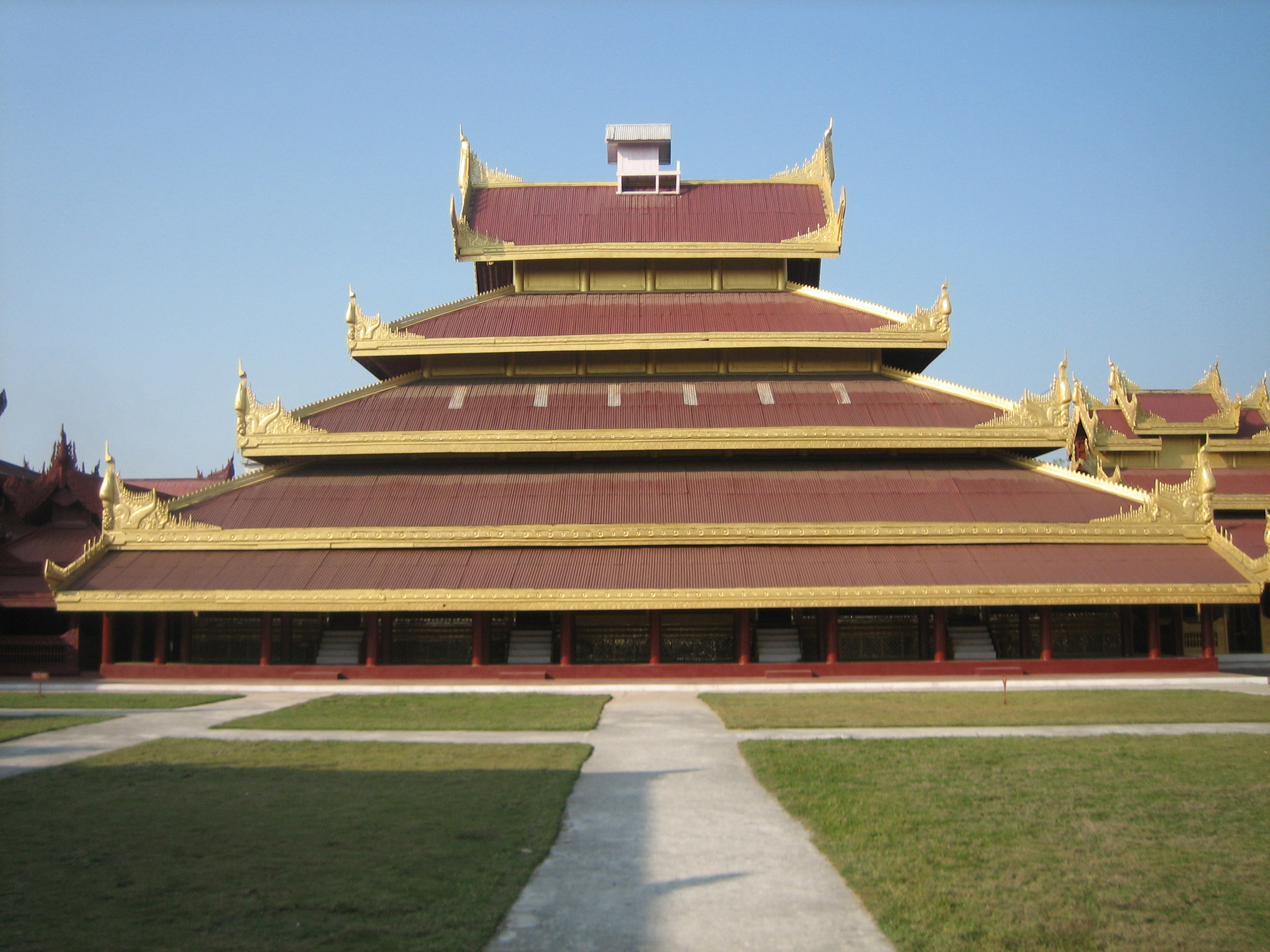
The Palace of Mirrors (Hmannan) inside Mandalay Palace

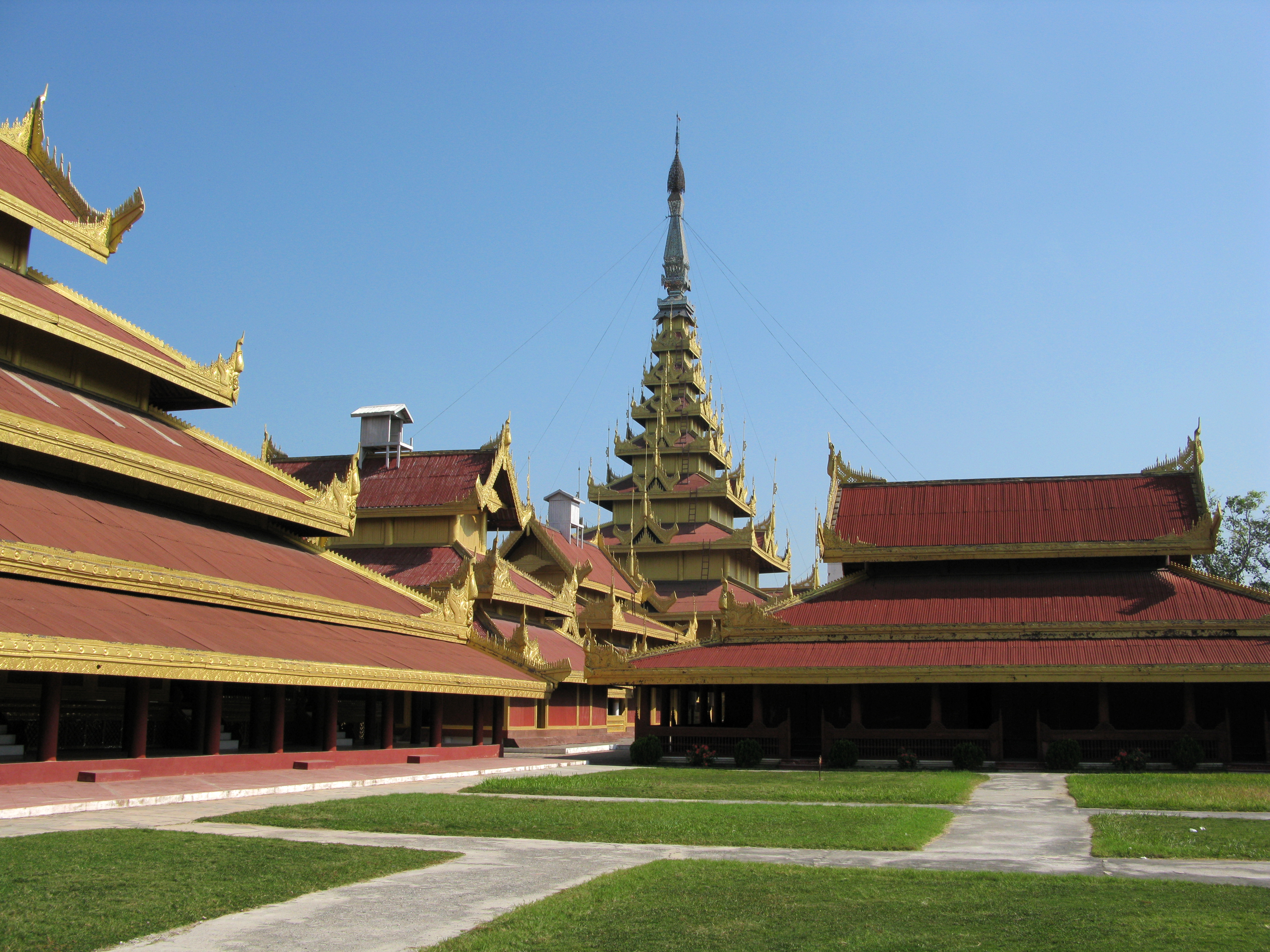
Great Audience Hall in Mandalay Palace

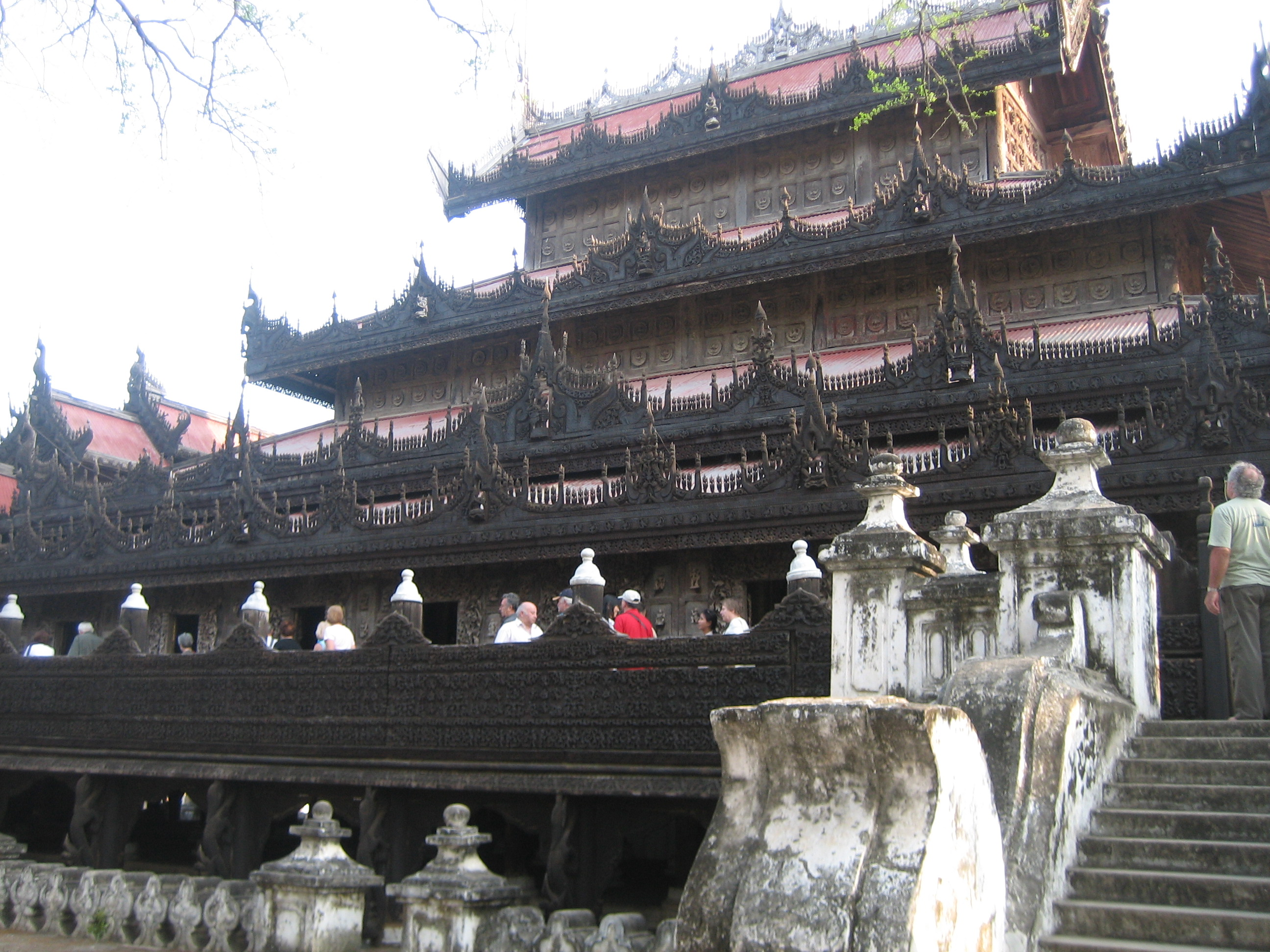
Shwe Kyaung, a famous monastery

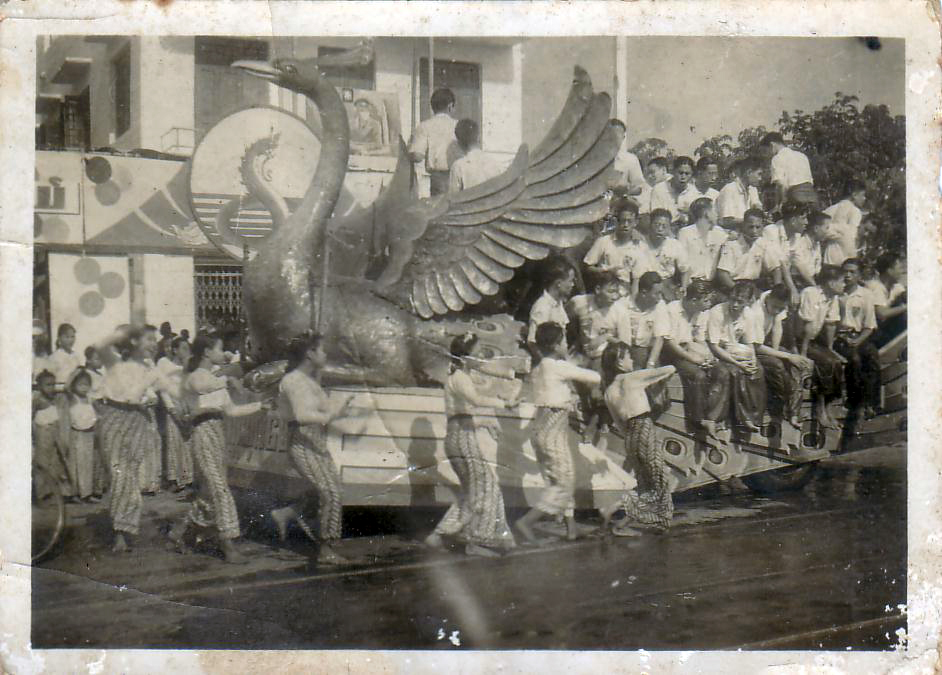
Mandalay early Thingyan Festival

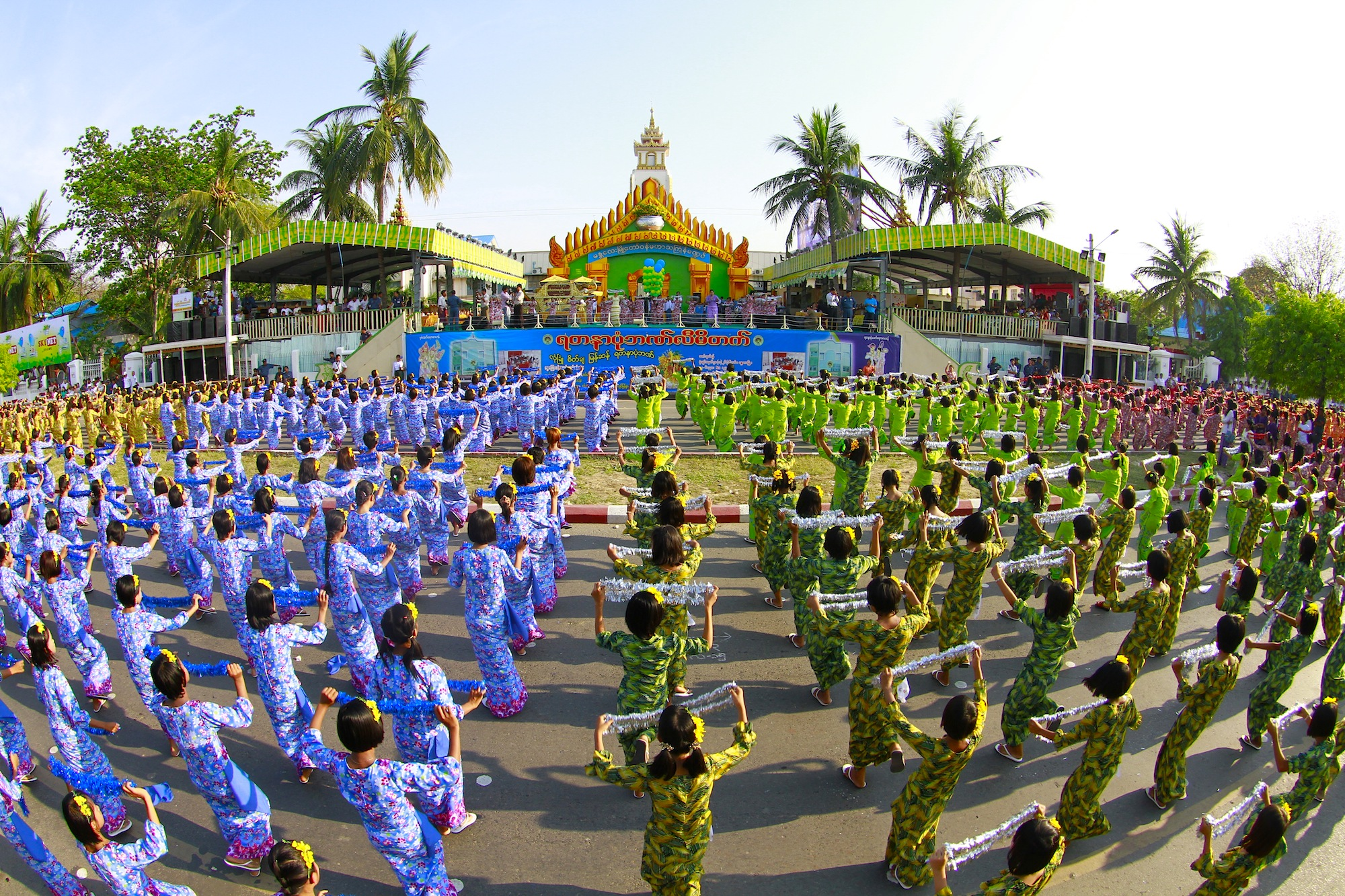
Opening Ceremony Myanmar Thingyan Festival in front of the City Hall

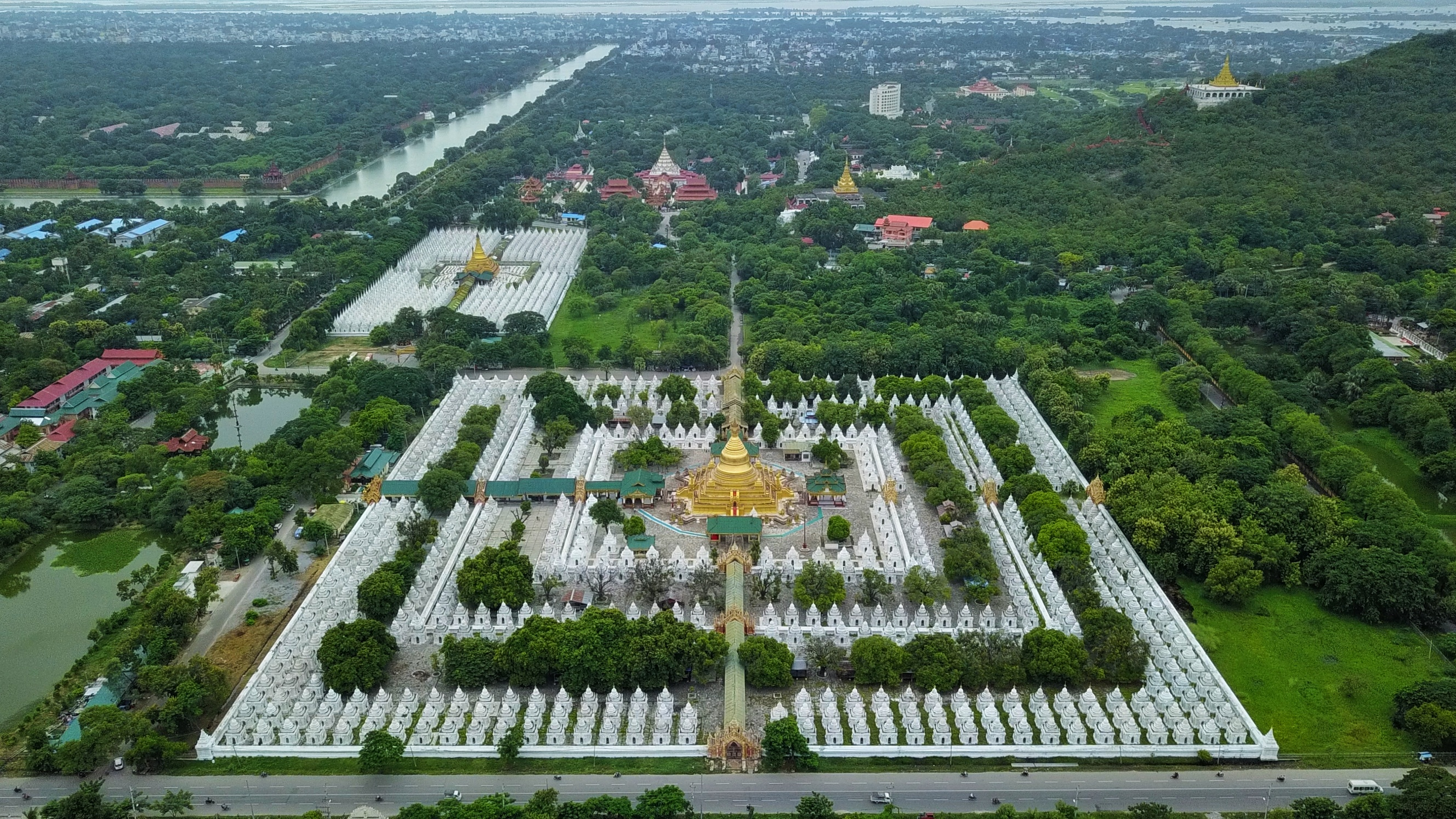
Kuthodaw Pagoda and Sandar Muni Pagoda

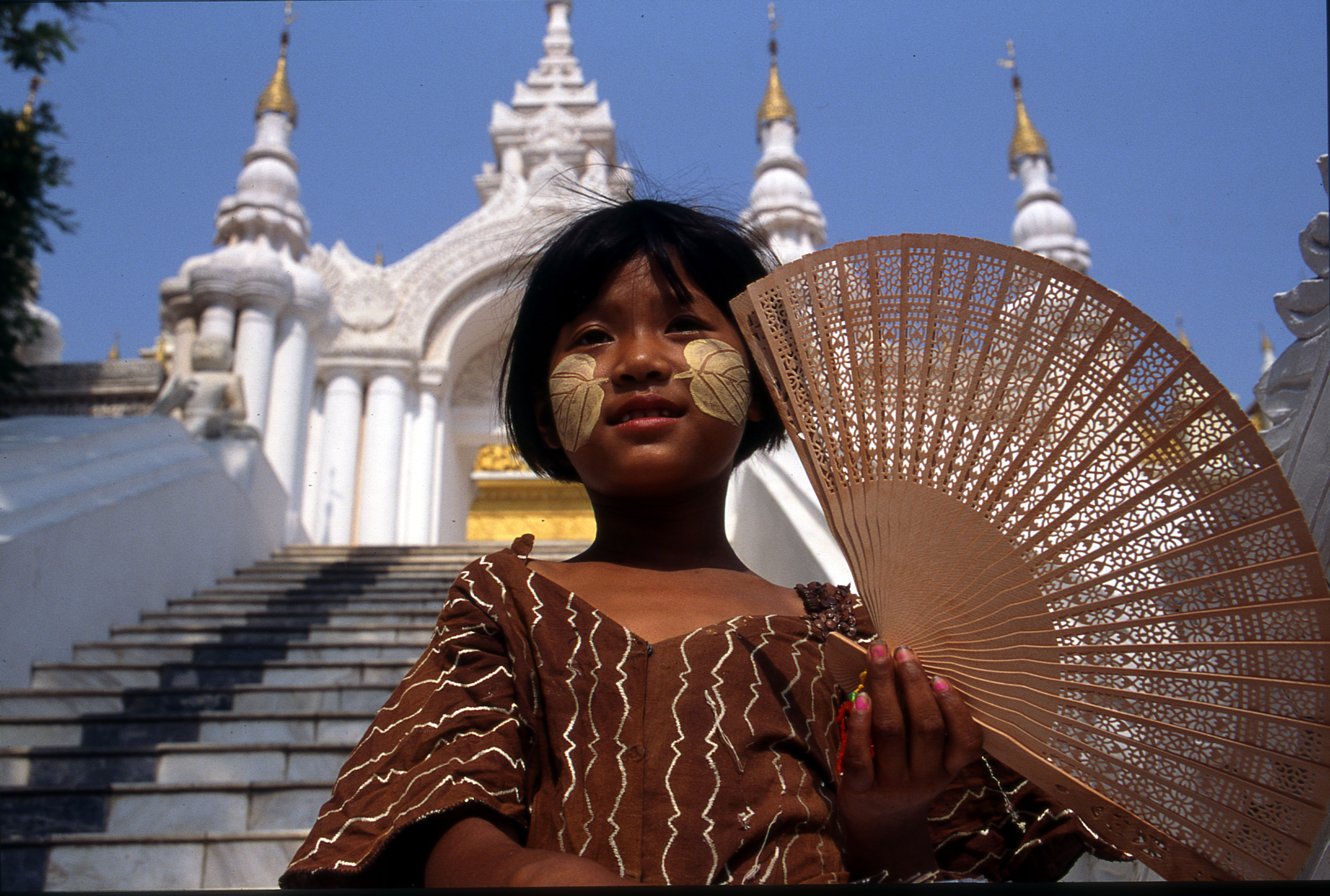
A Mandalayan girl

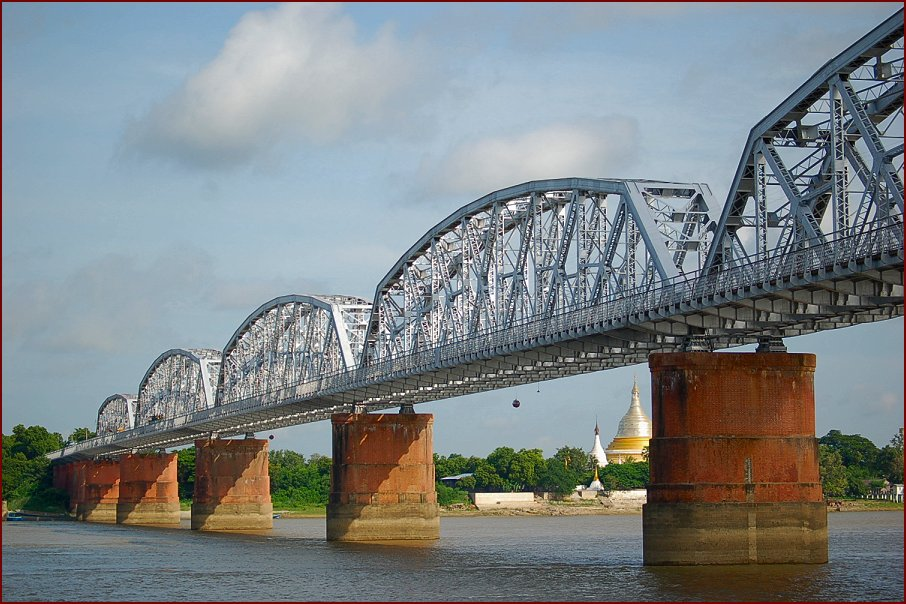
Now defunct old Sagaing Bridge

== See also ==
- Sacred Heart Cathedral, Mandalay
- Sandamuni Pagoda
- Setkyathiha Pagoda
- Shwekyimyin Pagoda
- State Pariyatti Sasana University, Mandalay

== Bibliography ==
- Larkin, Emma (6 March 2006). Finding George Orwell in Burma. Penguin Publishing Group. ISBN 978-1-101-11812-2.

Mandalay
Preceded by Amarapura	Capital of Burma; 23 May 1859 – 29 November 1885	Succeeded by Yangon
