= Yadanabon =

Yadanabon (Burmese: ရတနာပုံ [jədənàbòʊɰ̃] ) is a name of Mandalay, and may refer to:

- Mandalay, Myanmar
- Yadanabon F.C., a Myanmar National League football club based in Mandalay
- Yadanabon University, a public university in Amarapura, Mandalay
- Yadanabon Market
- Yadanabon Zoological Gardens
- Yadanabon Cyber City
- Yadanabon Bridge
- Yadanabon Hall

== People ==
- Yadanabon I of Pagan, consort of King Sithu I of Burma (r. 1112–67)
- Yadanabon II of Pagan, chief queen consort of King Narathihapate of Burma (r. 1256–62)
- Yadanabon of Pinya, Queen of Pinle and Pinya (r. 1300s–25)

== Publications ==
- Mani Yadanabon, a 1781 court treatise on precedents
- The Yadanabon, a daily newspaper published in Mandalay
- Mandalay Gazette, a monthly journal published in Los Angeles, California

== Other uses ==
- Ratana-pon, a Buddhist stupa in Mrauk-U, Rakhine State, Myanmar
- Yadanabon (film), a 1953 Burmese black-and-white drama film
- Yadanarbon, a Burmese drama television series
