= Than Win =

Burmese obstetrician, gynaecologist and politician (born 1953)

Professor Dr. Than Win
- သန်းဝင်း

Member of the House of Nationalities
- Incumbent
- Assumed office 1 February 2016
- Constituency: № 1 constituency of Mandalay Region
- Majority: 245982 (77.33%)

Rector of University of Medicine, Mandalay
- In office January 2008 – April 2013

Personal details
- Born: 2 April 1953 (age 73) Mandalay, Myanmar
- Party: National League for Democracy
- Spouse: Ni Ni Tin
- Parent(s): Than Tun (father); Mya Sein (mother)
- Education: University of Medicine, Mandalay (M.B.B.S)
- Occupation: Politician, Obstetrician and gynaecologist

Than Win (Burmese: သန်းဝင်း) is a Burmese obstetrician, gynaecologist and politician. He served as a member of Amyotha Hluttaw until his removal on 1 February 2021, following the military coup. He was a chairman of international relations committee of the Amyotha Hluttaw and a former rector of University of Medicine, Mandalay.

== Early life and education ==
Than Win was born to Than Tun, a rector of agricultural institute, and Mya Sein on 2 February 1953 at Mandalay. He went to Basic Education High School No. 9 Mandalay, and passed the matriculation examination with distinction in five subjects, the whole Burma top 7 in 1969. He enrolled at the University of Medicine Mandalay and graduated with the degree in MBBS in 1976. He completed his first master's degree in the field of obstetrics and gynecology (OG). He gained a scholarship to England and achieved MRCOG from the Royal College of Obstetricians and Gynaecologists. He also got DrMed Sc (OG), Dip-MedEd and FRCOG.

== Medical and academic career ==
He works as a lecturer in obstetrics and gynecology at the University of Medicine, Mandalay. He then became an associate professor. From there, he served as the pro-rector.

In 2008, Than Win was appointed as a rector of the University of Medicine Mandalay. He retired from the rector in 2013. In 2014, he was awarded as an emeritus professor of University of Medicine Mandalay.

== Political career ==
In the 2015 Myanmar general election, Than Win contested in No. 1 constituency of Mandalay Region, inclusive of Aungmyethazan Township, Chanayethazan Township and Patheingyi Township, from the National League for Democracy, and won a House of Nationalities seat.
