= Trams in Mandalay =

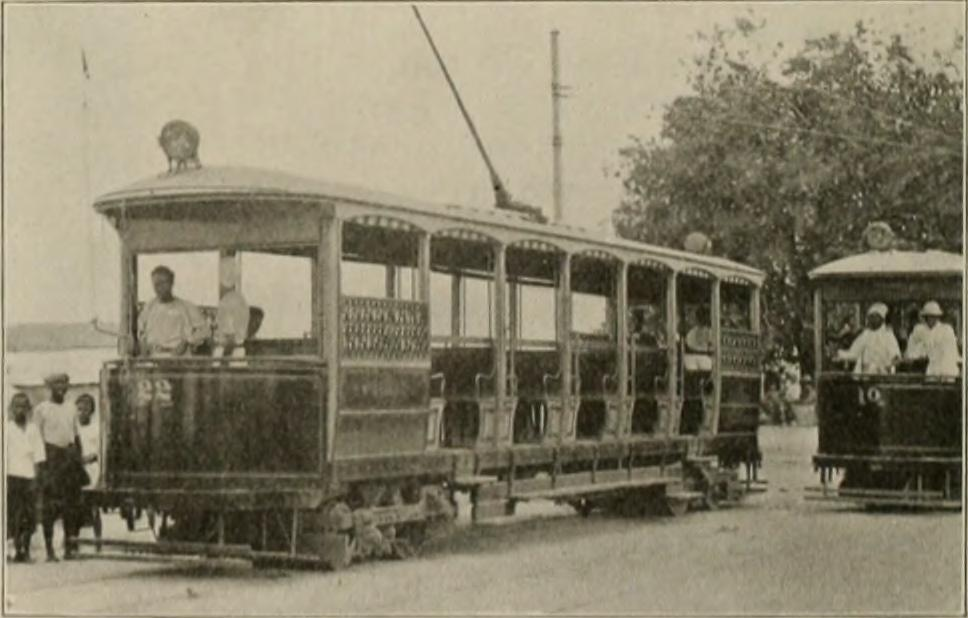
Electric street cars used in Mandalay

The Trams in Mandalay were owned and operated by the Mandalay Electric Company, which was incorporated in London in October 1902 with a capital of £ 200,000.

== History ==
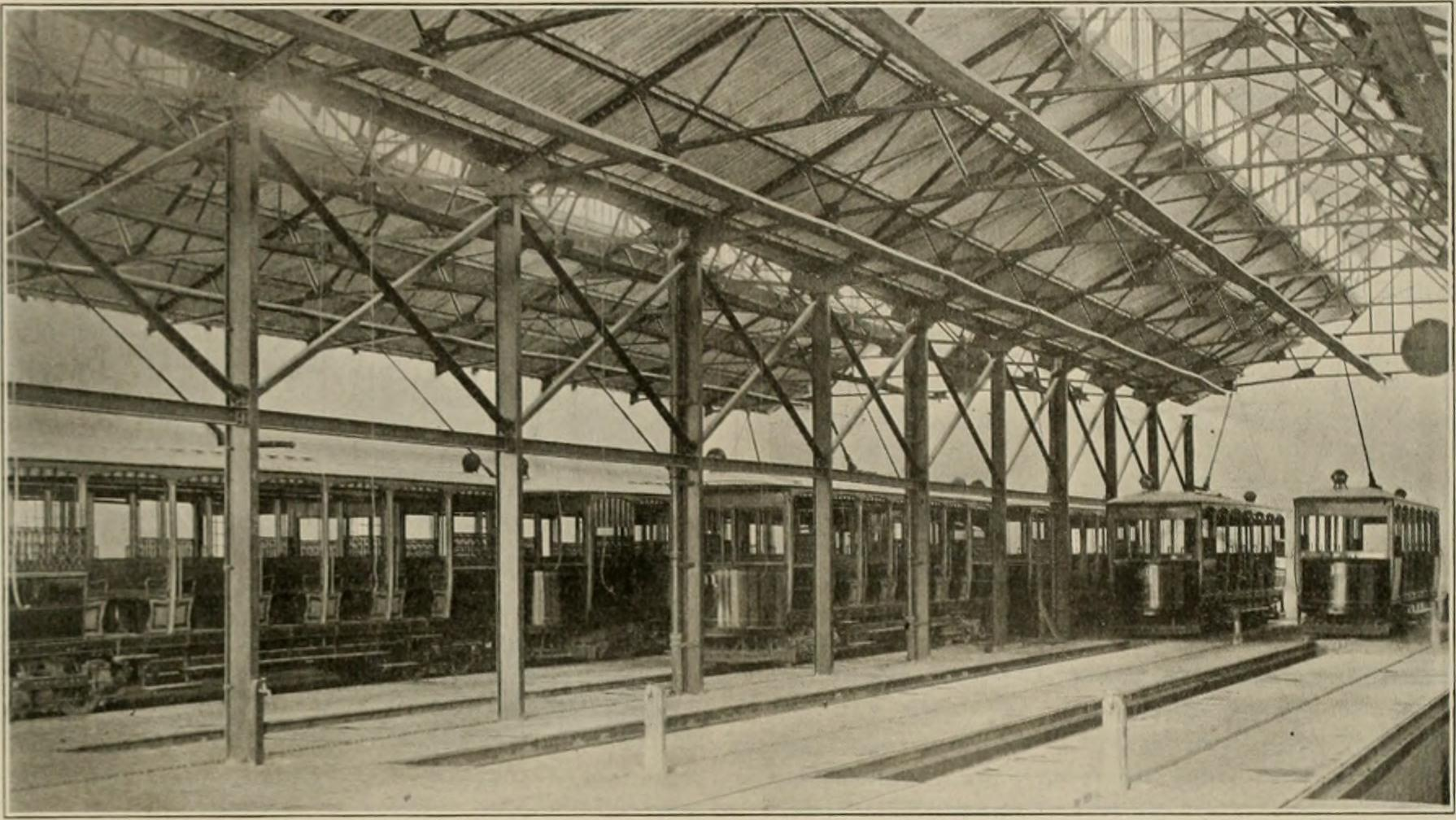
Car barns of the Mandalay Electric Company

The construction began in December 1902 by Dick, Kerr & Co., and the first car was moved electrically on 17 June 1904. From the center at Zegyo bazar the tramway radiated in the following three branches:

- To the shore, where the steamers embarked their passengers
- To the Arakan Pagoda
- To the Court House

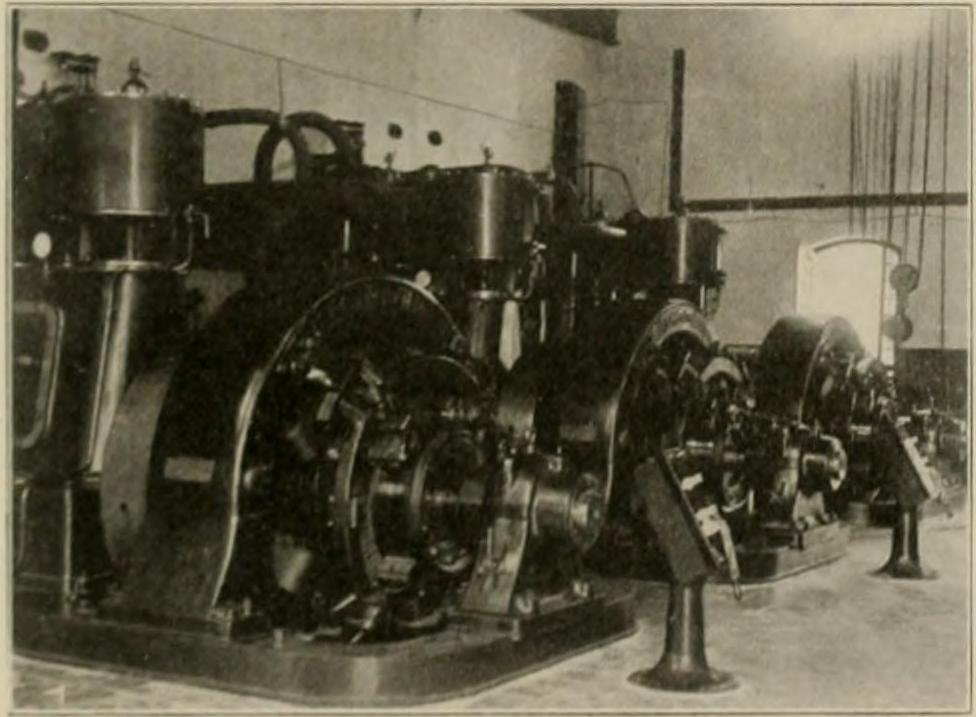
Interior of the generator room

The track had a gauge of 3 ft 6 in (1,067 mm) and a length of 7 miles (11 km), electrified double track throughout. The rails were 6 inches (152 mm) high with a 1.5-inch (38 mm) groove, laid at 45-foot (13.72 m) lengths. The rails were double spiked onto hardwood sleepers, which had been laid on a ballast bed.

The rolling stock consisted of 24 electric motor cars. These were of the single deck, open, cross bench type, built by the Electric Railway & Tramway Carriage Works in Preston, Lancashire. The car bodies were 24 feet 4.5 inches (7,430 mm) in length and about 6 feet (1,830 mm) wide and provided seats for 48 passengers. The bogies were made by Brush and their wheels driven by two Dick, Kerr & Co. standard 25B traction motors, each capable of delivering approximately 28 hp (21 kW) and could be braked in emergency by specially arranged resistors. The roof frames were composed entirely of teak, covered by cotton laid in a wet coat of white paint. They had electric headlights with 100 V.

The power house with three Babcock & Wilcox water tube boilers with a working pressure of 160 pounds per square inch (1,100 kPa) was built in 78th street alongside the necessary offices, car sheds and repair shops.

The track and overhead cables were severely damaged during the air raid of 3 April 1942 and subsequently were dismantled.
