= Yokesone Monastery =

Yokesone Monastery (Burmese: ရုပ်စုံကျောင်း, Yokesone Kyaung) is a common name for historic Burmese Buddhist monasteries (kyaung). The name may refer to the following monasteries:

- Yokesone Monastery, Mandalay
- Yokesone Monastery, Sagaing
- Yokesone Monastery, Salay
- Yokesone Monastery, Sagu
- Yokesone Monastery, Legaing
