= Tabe Prince =

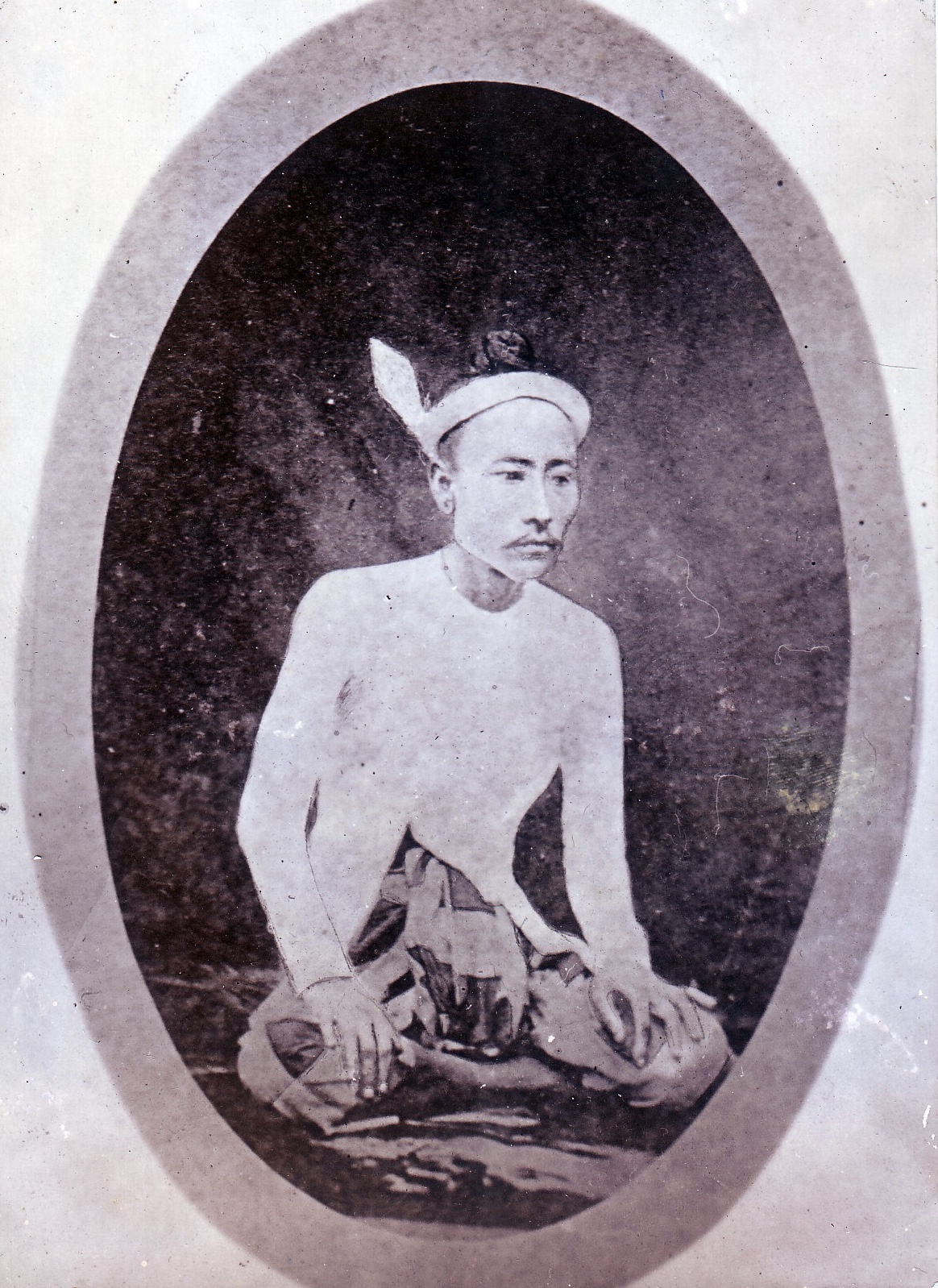
- Tabe Prince
- Born: Maung Ba unknown
- Died: 1879; Mandalay Palace
- Spouse: Tabe Khin U Tabe Khin Thit
- House: Konbaung
- Father: Le-bo U Sai
- Mother: Duchess of Ahrlarkatpa

Maung Ba, Tabe Prince (တပယ်မင်းသား မောင်ဘ) was a Burmese prince and nobleman during the Konbaung dynasty in Burma. Although not of royal blood, he was granted the title of prince by his cousin, King Mindon. Prince Tabe was accused of orchestrating the execution of court poet U Ponnya, one of Burma's greatest literary figures.

== Biography ==
Maung Ba was the son of Le-bo U Sai and Duchess of Ahrlarkatpa, the younger sister of Chandra Mata Mahe, Queen of the South Royal Chamber, who was the mother of King Mindon. He had an older sister, Seindon Mibaya, the senior queen consort of King Mindon. Therefore, Prince Tabe was both a maternal cousin and brother-in-law to King Mindon. When King Mindon ascended to the throne, he promoted Maung Ba to the rank of prince and received the appanage of Tabe. Passionate about the arts, Tabe Prince collected court songs and poems.

One day, Prince Tabe sent a messenger to summon the court poet U Ponnya to compose a poem. However, U Ponnya was already busy writing poems for other princes, so he informed the messenger that he would not be able to come until he had finished his current work. The following day, Prince Tabe called again. Frustrated by being busy, U Ponnya angrily responded, "I'm currently writing for the real princes. I'm unable to come at the request of the yamane prince right now, but I will be able to once I finish my other work". The term yamane is the Burmese name for beechwood, often used for crafting Burmese prince puppets. By using this term, U Ponnya implied that Tabe Prince was not a real royal prince. This response from U Ponnya deeply wounded Tabe Prince's pride, leaving him feeling humiliated. This humiliation festered into resentment towards U Ponnya.

In 1867, U Ponnya was falsely accused of being involved in the Myingun Myinkhondaing rebellion. He was arrested and brought to the mansion of Count Thar Oe, where he was killed. On his death, King Mindon remarked, "A dog killing a man" (လူကိုခွေးသတ်လေခြင်း). Burmese historians believe that U Ponnya's death was ordered by Tabe Prince due to his resentment.

In the historical book Biography of Bo Wazira, which features an interview with Bo Wazira, the publisher and editor of Burma's first newspaper Yadanabon, he recounts the story of U Ponnya's death based on his conversation with Count Thar Oe. Bo Wazira had served as a mentor to Count Thar Oe's son. He recalled asking Count Thar Oe, "Many say you executed U Ponnya, is that true?" Count Thar Oe replied, "Umm! I was simply unlucky to be blamed for this. I'm the city governor, after all. In truth, the death was carried out by order of Tabe Prince. Knowing that His Majesty would be displeased, they shifted the blame onto me. So, I couldn't dare to accuse the prince and had to endure this situation".

He was executed during the 1879 massacre at Mandalay Palace, where over 40 members of the royal family were brutally murdered. This horrific event was instigated by Queen Hsinbyumashin, who issued an edict ordering the elimination of nearly all potential heirs to the throne.

Tabe Prince had many concubines. Two of them, Tabe Khin U and Tabe Khin Thit, were renowned artists in the royal court. Their teacher was the Minister of Court Drama, Kun O Htein. They were permitted to perform before the Chief Queen. Tabe Khin Thit was not only a skilled singer but also a proficient dancer, particularly in traditional Thai dance. Tabe Khin U, on the other hand, was famous for her vocal abilities, especially in Mahāgīta. After the fall of the kingdom, Tabe Khin U and Tabe Khin Thit sought refuge with Sir Sao Chel, the Saopha of Hsipaw. There, they became the teachers of his consort, Saw Mya Aye Kyi, who later became one of the greatest Burmese classical musicians.
