= Basic Education High School No. 9 Mandalay =

Secondary school in Mandalay, Myanmar

Coordinates: 21°59′12.8″N 96°04′37.4″E

- အမှတ် (၉) အခြေခံပညာအထက်တန်းကျောင်း မန္တလေး

Location
- 24th st. × 86th st. Mandalay, Mandalay Region; Myanmar

Information
- Former name: St. Peter's High School
- Type: Public
- Founder: De La Salle Brothers
- Principal: Ohnmar Kyi (since 2017)
- Staff: over 35 (2019-2020)
- Grades: K-10
- Gender: Both male and female
- Age range: 5-17
- Enrollment: over 550 (2019-2020)
- Language: Burmese
- Campus size: 6.3 acres

Basic Education High School No. 9 Mandalay (Burmese: အခြေခံ ပညာအထက်တန်းကျောင်း အမှတ် (၉) မန္တလေး; formerly, St. Peter's High School and State High School No. 9 Mandalay, commonly known as St. Peter's, SHS 9 Mandalay and BEHS 9 Mandalay (အထက (၉) မန္တလေး), is a public secondary school located in downtown Mandalay, Myanmar. Founded in 1897 during the British colonial period, the school was long known as St. Peter's English High School and operated as a Roman Catholic parochial institution administered by the De La Salle Brothers.

== History ==
=== St. Peter's High School (1897–1965) ===
St. Peter's High School was founded on 1 May 1897 by the De La Salle Brothers, a Roman Catholic teaching order. It was the first La Sallian high school founded in Upper Burma, and the third in the whole Burma after St. Patrick's in Mawlamyine and St. Paul's in Rangoon.

St. Peter's High School was started teaching over 80 students. In 1924, there were 11 teachers and 350 students, including 130 resident students.

Brother Director John managed the school for 18 years until he moved to St. Paul's in 1915. The swimming pool was constructed during his administration. Brother Clementian served as Brother Director from 1933 to 1948 for the first time, and from 1950 to 1956 for the second time. In 1952, Primary School was opened at the two-storey hall (now Nyana Hall) on the left side of the east gate. In 1955, a new Chapel and Study Hall were extended at the three-storey building. In 1957, during the administration of Brother Director Peter, a single-storeyed Kindergarten Hall was built on the southern campus of the school. It was reconstructed as a two-storey building (now Thiha Hall) in 1962–1963.

Since it was opened, the school accepted boys only for some time. The all-boys school was among the few early schools that educated the children of the country's British officers, the Anglo-Burmese, the Anglo-Indians and the wealthy Burmese. The language of instruction was mainly English in the early days, and bi-lingual for some classes in the later days. There were also some Hebrew classes for the Jewish.

=== State High School No. 9 Mandalay (1965-1983) ===
In April 1965, the military government under Ne Win nationalized the school as part of a nationwide education reform. The institution was renamed State High School No. 9 Mandalay, and Burmese became the primary language of instruction. Following nationalization, the school’s role and prestige declined relative to its pre-1965 status, in part due to zoning policies requiring students to attend nearby schools.

== Extracurricular activities ==
=== Sports ===
The school maintains facilities for football, basketball, badminton, table tennis, volleyball, cricket, and chinlone.

=== Clubs and activities ===
Academic and extracurricular clubs operate according to the annual academic calendar. Activities include arts, music, physical training, moral education, and life-skills programs.

=== Fife and drum corps ===
During its period as St. Peter's High School, the school maintained a well-known boys’ fife and drum band. The band was later dissolved. In 2019, alumni coordinated with school administrators to re-establish a fife and drum corps.

== Uniform ==
Like all public schools in Myanmar, students of BEHS 9 Mandalay have to wear the school uniform at all times. There are two sets of uniform— one from KG to 4th Standard, and another more traditional one from the 5th Standard to 10th Standard. But all uniforms are of the same colour— a white shirt or blouse, with a green garment for the torso.

== Campus ==
BEHS 9 is one of the few high schools in Mandalay with a sizable campus, covering perhaps 75% of the entire city square block. The compound of St. Michael's Church Mandalay, west of the school, takes up the other 25% of the block. (The school is bounded by 86th Shwetachaung road to the east and 87th street to the west.) Shwe Kyee Myin Pagoda, Basic Education High School No. 10 Mandalay (formerly, Diocesan High School), Basic Education High School No. 8 Mandalay (formerly, St. Joseph's Convent School), Basic Education High School No. 11 Mandalay, Basic Education High School No. 4 Mandalay, and Basic Education High School No. 1 Mandalay are located in the vicinity of the school.

During the World War II, when the school was transformed into a hospital, St. Peter's High School was reopened at the Norman school campus (now BEHS 4 Mandalay). Its campus moved to its original and current place in 1952.

The current school, BEHS 9, is open in the gated southern campus since the northern campus, inclusive of three-storey building, is donated to the Department of Basic Education, Ministry of Education in Myanmar.

The gated campus consists of:

- Nyana Hall (Wisdom Hall), two-storey red building, for ceremonial hall and principal's office (1st floor); examination hall (2nd floor)

(It is the Main Hall)

- Nawarat Hall, two-storey building, for KG, Grade 1 and library (1st floor); devotional shrine room and language lab (2nd floor)
- Assembly field at the frontage of Nawarat Hall
- New Hall, L-shape one-storey building, for staff office, laboratory rooms and locker room (frontage); hostel for the principal (back side)
- Thiha Hall, two-storey building, for all classes from Grade 2 to Grade 11
- Badminton and table-tennis courts
- Basketball court
- Regulation size football pitch
- Smaller practice football pitch; also used as outdoor volleyball and cricket courts
- Chinlone court
- Cafeteria.

== Notable alumni ==
=== Civil and military politicians ===
Name	Notability
Zaw Myint Maung	Chief minister of Mandalay regional government
Ye Lwin	Mandalay mayor; Mandalay regional minister of city development affairs; chairman of Mandalay City Development Committee (MCDC)
Than Win	Member of Amyotha Hluttaw; former rector of University of Medicine Mandalay
Kyaw Myint (physician)	Former member of Pyithu Hluttaw; former minister of health; former rector of University of Medicine 1, Yangon

=== Professionals, artists and businessmen ===
Name	Notability
S.N.Goenka	Burmese-Indian Vipassanā training teacher
Khine Htoo	Singer
Kyaw Win	First Burmese actor who won Myanmar Academy Award for Best Male Artiste in 1952
Edward Michael Law-Yone	Journalist; author
Maung Maung Ta	Actor
U Thaung	Journalist

== Former principals ==
=== BEHS 9 Mandalay ===
1. Hla
2. Nyan Tun
3. May May Tin
4. Than Hnit
5. Khin Nyunt Yee
6. Yi Yi May
7. San Yu Mar (2009–2014)
8. Mya Mya Than (2014–2017)
9. Ohnmar Kyi (2017–present)
