= List of hospitals in Mandalay =

This is a list of hospitals in Mandalay, Myanmar.

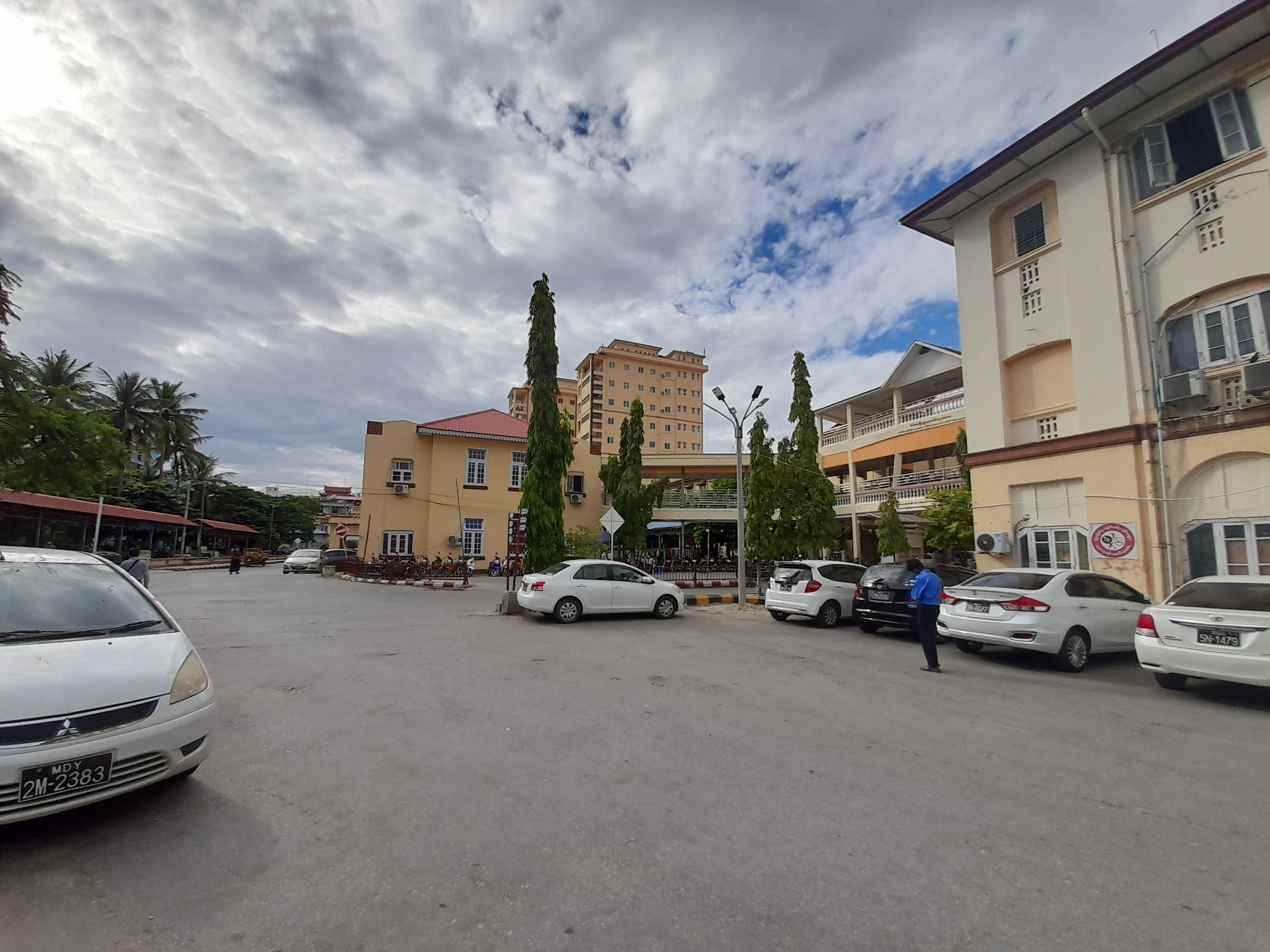
Mandalay General Hospital

== Public hospitals ==
- Mandalay Central Women's Hospital

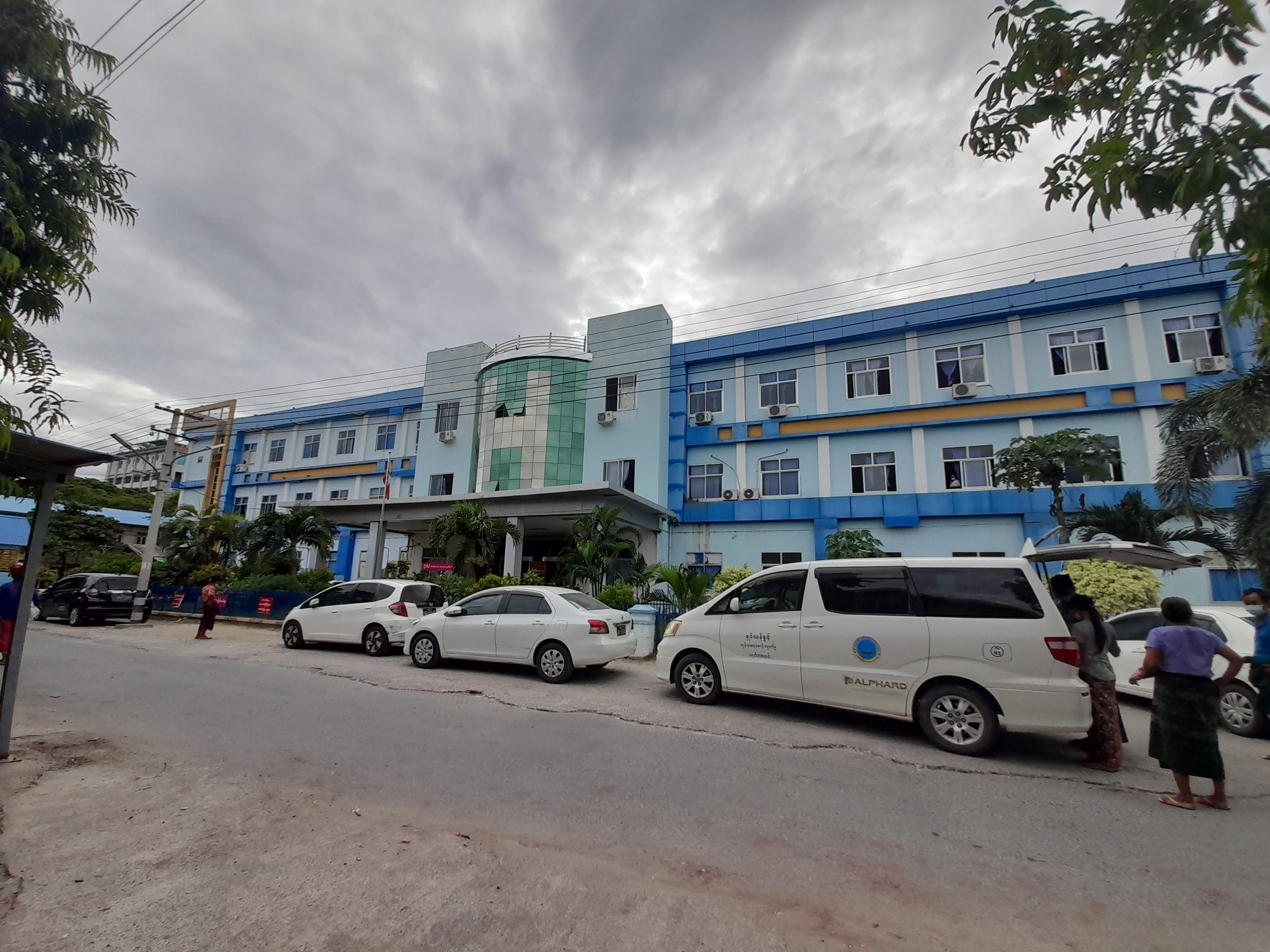

- 550-Bed Mandalay Children's Hospital

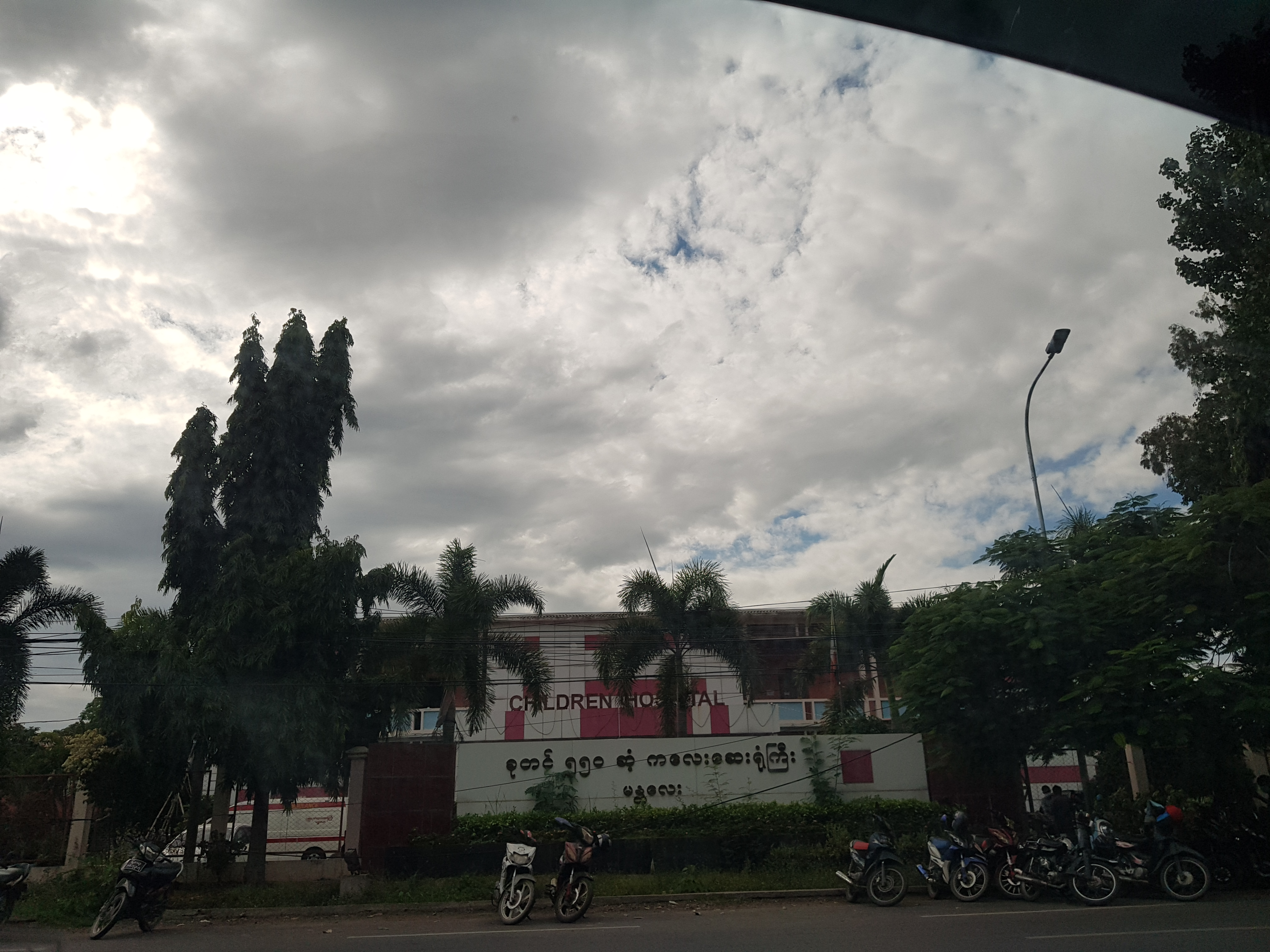

- 300-Bed Children's Hospital

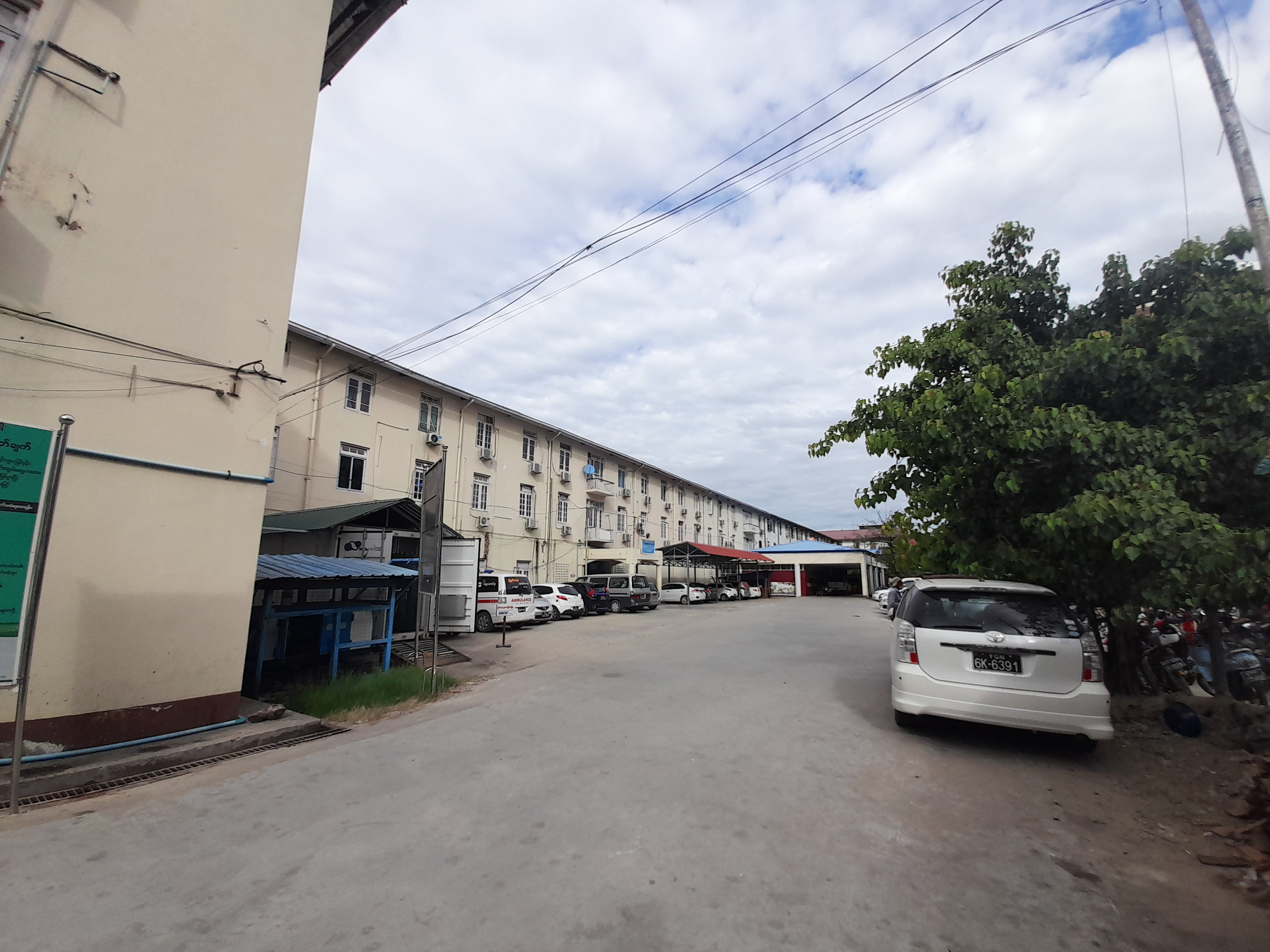

- Mandalay EENT Hospital

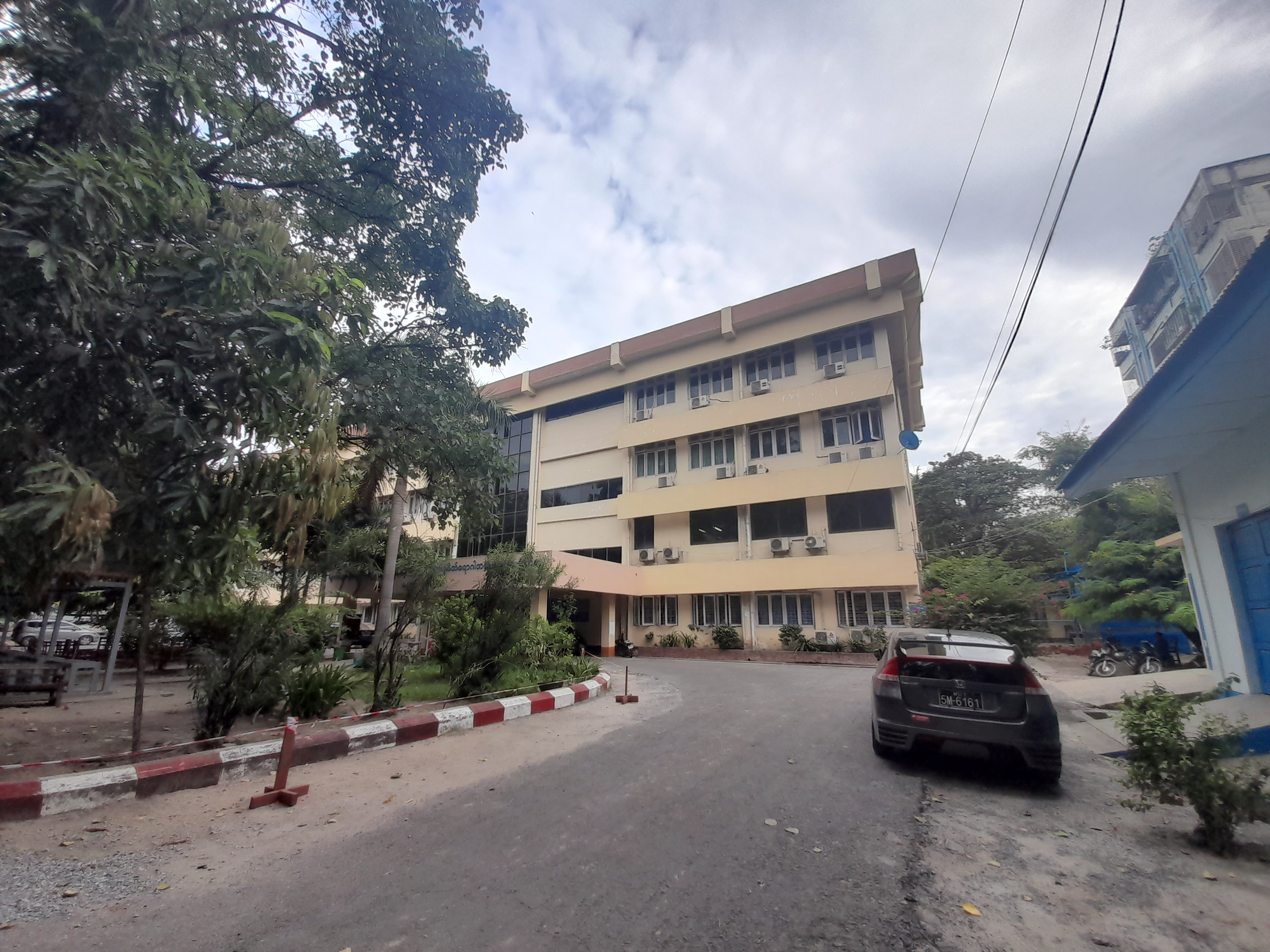

- Mandalay General Hospital

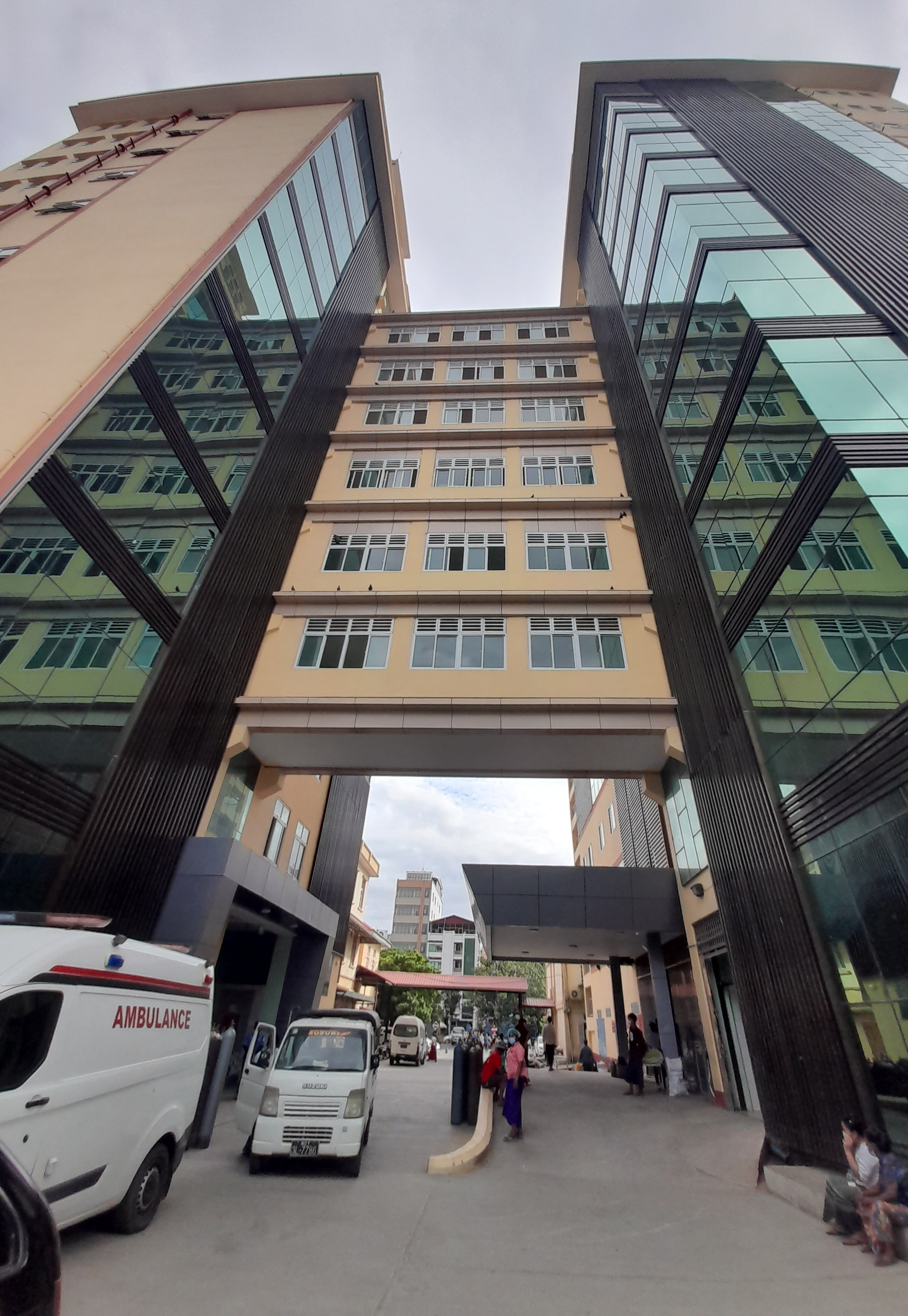

- Mandalay Infectious Diseases Hospital
- Mandalay Mental Health Hospital
- Mandalay Traditional Medicine Hospital

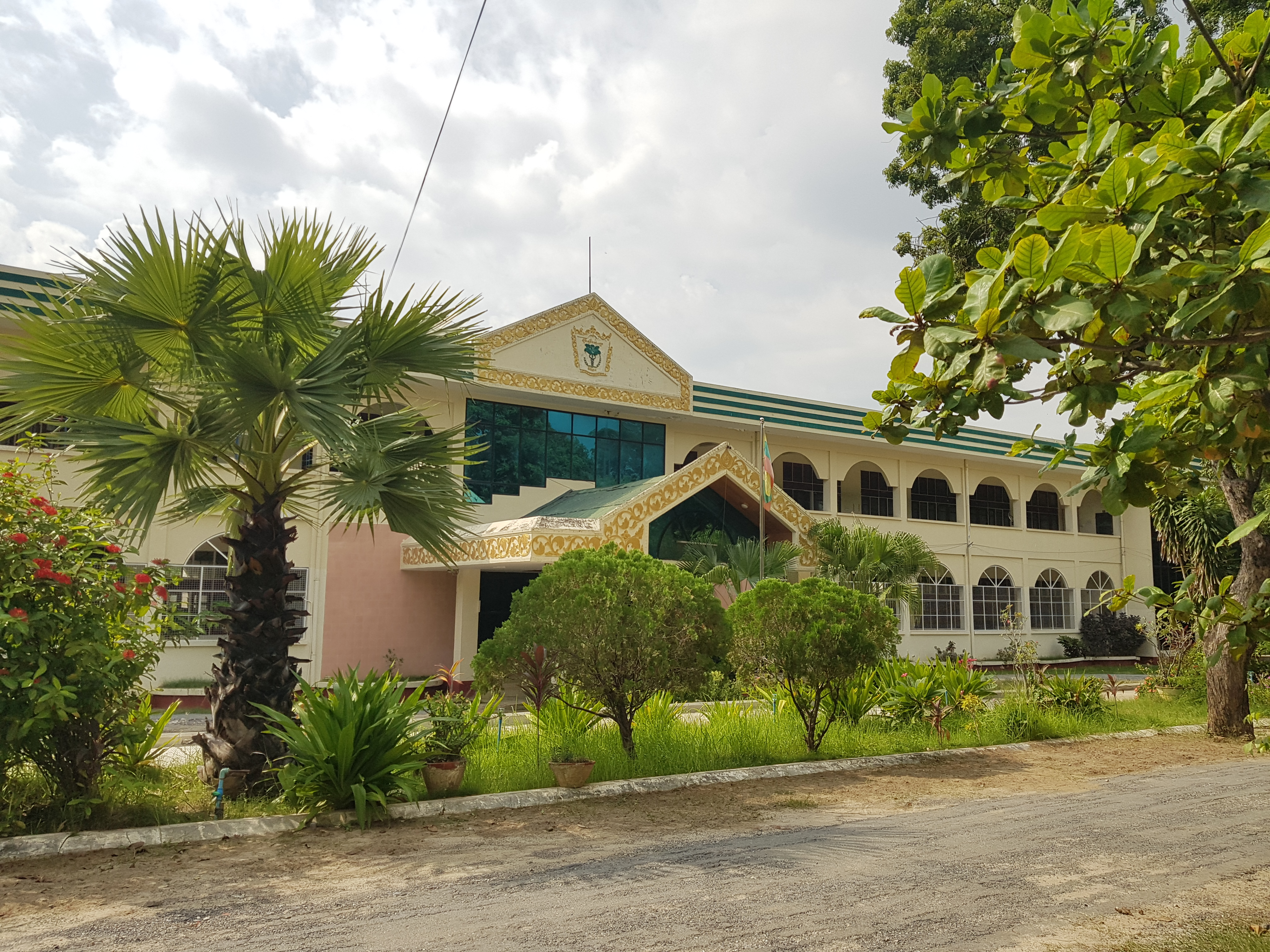

- 300-Bed Mandalay Training Hospital

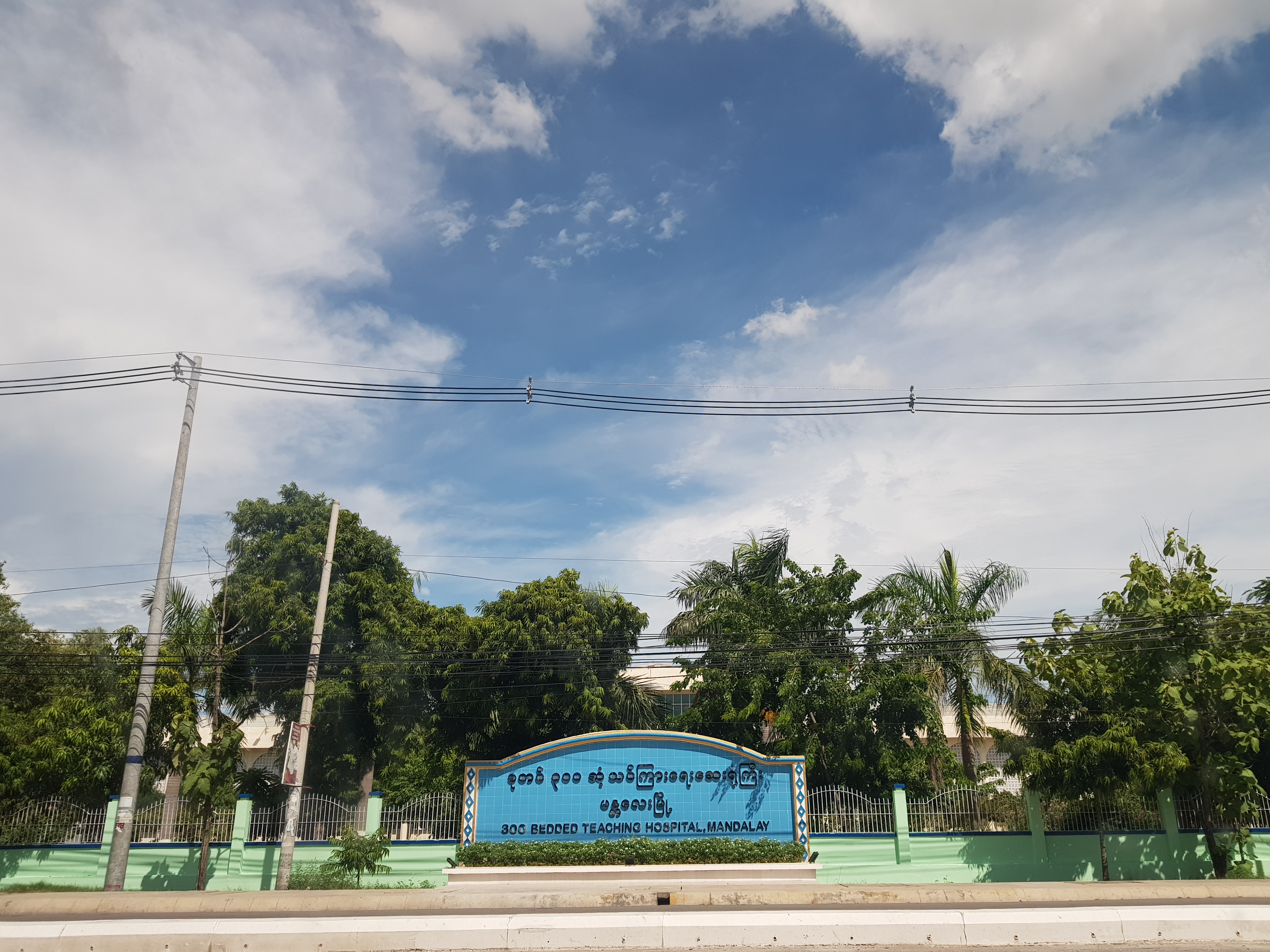

- Mandalay Tuberculosis Hospital
- Mandalay Workers' Hospital

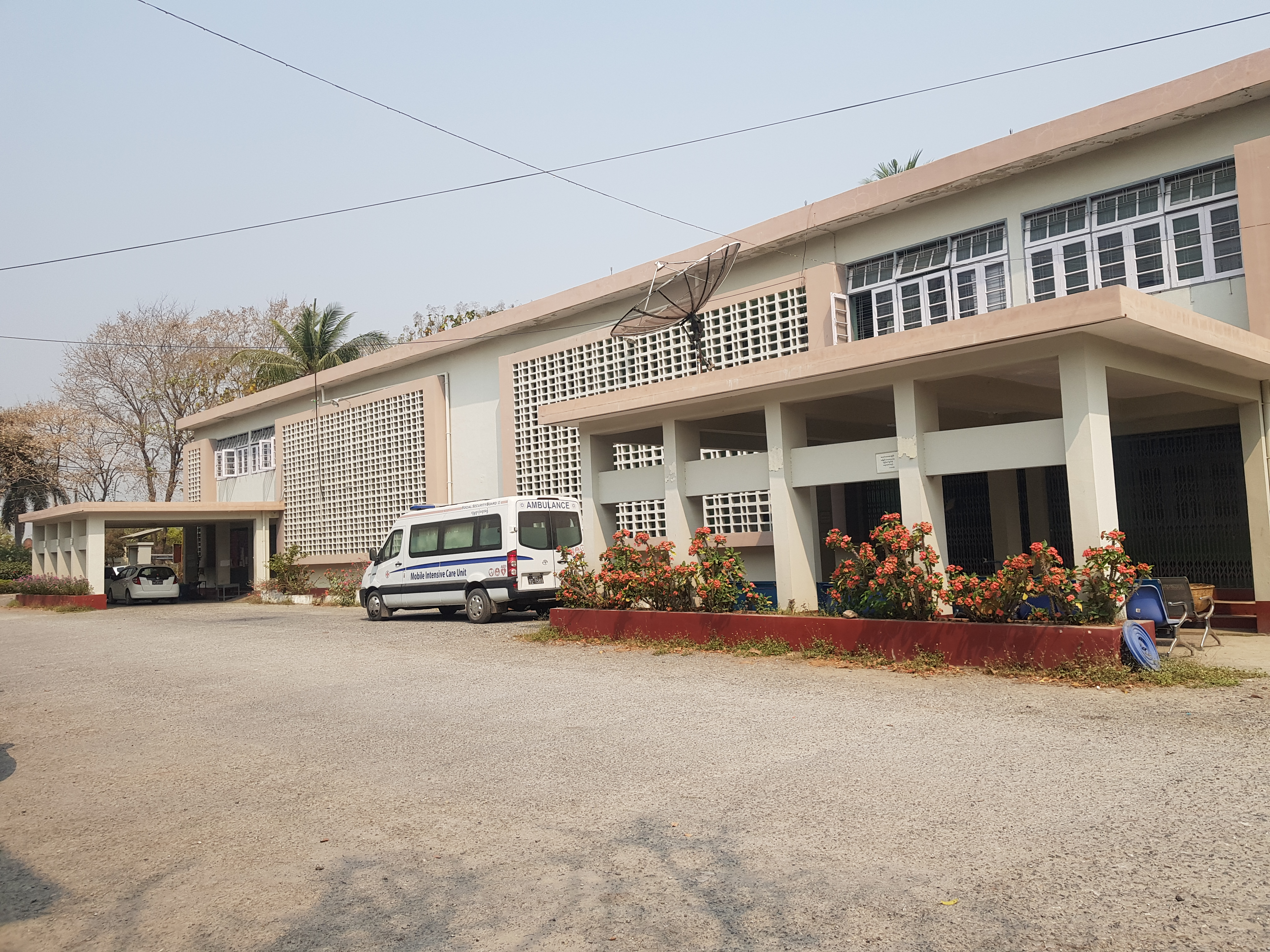

- Mandalay Orthopaedics Hospital
- University Hospital, Mandalay
