= Man Buddha Temple =

Buddhist temple in Myanmar

Shinbin Maha Laba Man Buddha
- ရှင်ပင်မဟာလာဘမံဘုရား
- Location within Myanmar

Religion
- Affiliation: Theravada Buddhism

Location
- Country: Sale, Magwe Region, Burma
- Coordinates: 20.835648°N 94.745540°E

Architecture
- Completed: c. 1300; 726 years ago

The Man Buddha Temple (Burmese: မံဘုရား) is a Buddhist temple in Sale, Magway Region, Myanmar that houses the Shinbin Maha Laba Man Buddha (Burmese: ရှင်ပင်မဟာလာဘမံဘုရား).

The Buddha image is nearly 20 feet (6.1 m) tall, and purportedly floated from Monywa to Sale (also spelled Salay) in 1888 after extensive flooding in the area. The hollow Buddha image is coated with gold lacquer, and is the largest lacquer Buddha image in Myanmar. The style of the Buddha image dates to c. 1300.

== See also ==
- Buddhism in Myanmar
