= U Ponnya =

Ponnya
- ဦးပုည
- Born: Maung Po Si; 20 August 1812; Thursday, 13th waxing of Wagaung 1174 ME; Sale, Kingdom of Burma
- Died: c. 1867
- Education: Amarapura (အမရပူရ)
- Occupations: Writer, poet
- Writing career
- Language: Burmese
- Period: Konbaung Dynasty

Ponnya (Burmese: ဦးပုည; 1812 - c. 1867), known honorifically as U Ponnya, was one of Burma's most prominent dramatists. Ponnya is considered one of Burma's greatest literary figures, known for his elegant wit and clarity of language.

== Biography ==
Ponnya was born in 1812 to the Ponnya Thaman family, a prominent chieftain family in the town of Sale (also spelt Salay), in present-day Magway Region. Ponnya was educated at the Bhamo monastic college in Amarapura.

As a Konbaung Dynasty court playwright during the 19th century, he is primarily known for his morality tales. Ponnya served as one of King Mindon Min's court poets. He gained prominence after joining Prince Kanaung Mintha's establishment in the 1850s, becoming known for his literary talent.

Throughout his prolific career, he wrote seven plays, primarily based on the Buddhist jatakas, as well as poems and songs, more than 30 Buddhist prose works, and treatises in fields ranging from medicine to astrology. Ponnya also revived a 15th-century genre in Burmese literature, the myittasa (မေတ္တာစာ), a form of verse letter. Because of his writing skills, he is called Myanmar's Shakespeare (မြန်မာပြည် ရှိတ်စပီးယား) by modern people. He also described himself: "Because my poetry intelligence always comes out when extracted" (ကဗျာဉာဏ်အာဘော်ကလည်း ကလော်တိုင်းထွက်သောကြောင့်).

The royal government conferred on him the title "Minhla Thinkhaya" and granted him the Ywazi village as his appanage. His writer rival is Achote Tann Sayar Phay (အချုပ်တန်းဆရာဖေ).

In 1867, U Ponnya was falsely accused of being involved in the Myingun Myinkhondaing rebellion. He was arrested and brought to the mansion of Count Thar Oe, where he was killed. Unable to bear the loss, King Mindon remarked on his death, saying, "A dog killing a man" (လူကိုခွေးသတ်လေခြင်း). Burmese historians believe that U Ponnya's death was ordered by Tabe Prince due to his resentment.

In the historical book Biography of Bo Wazira, which features an interview with Bo Wazira, the publisher and editor of Burma's first newspaper Yadanabon, he recounts the story of U Ponnya's death based on his conversation with Count Thar Oe. Bo Wazira had served as a mentor to Count Thar Oe's son. He recalled asking Count Thar Oe, Many say you executed U Ponnya, is that true? Count Thar Oe replied, Umm! I was simply unlucky to be blamed for this. I am the city governor, after all. In truth, the death was carried out by order of Tabe Prince. Knowing that His Majesty would be displeased, they shifted the blame onto me. So, I couldn't dare to accuse the prince and had to endure this situation.

== List of works ==
- Wizaya Pyazat (ဝိဇယပြဇာတ်)
- Padoma Pyazat (ပဒုမပြဇာတ်)
- Yethe Pyazat (ရေသည်ပြဇာတ်)
- Kawthala Pyazat (ကောသလပြဇာတ်)
- Wathudewa Pyazat (ဝါသုဒေဝပြဇာတ်)
