= Ju (writer) =

Burmese novelist (born 1958)

- ဂျူး
- Born: Tin Tin Win (တင်တင်ဝင်း); 20 September 1958 (age 67); Yenangyaung, Magway Division, Burma
- Education: Institute of Medicine, Mandalay
- Occupations: Writer, physician
- Writing career
- Language: Burmese
- Period: 1979–present
- Genres: Romance, short story
- Notable work: A Hmat T'ya (Remembrance) (1987)

Ju (Burmese: ဂျူး; born Tin Tin Win on 20 September 1958) is a Burmese novelist, well known for her strong, intelligent female characters.

== Early life and education ==
Ju was born 20 September 1958 in Yenangyaung. She is the third child of U Thaung and Daw Nyein, having five siblings. She graduated from the high school at Yenangyaung in 1975 and graduating with an MBBS degree from Institute of Medicine, Mandalay in 1983.

== Career ==
Despite her interest in writing, upon her mother's prodding, she pursued medical studies at the Institute of Medicine, Mandalay. She started writing while in medical school University of Medicine, Mandalay and her first short story (ရာဇဝင်ထဲမှာမောင့်ကိုထားရစ်ခဲ့) was published in 1979. Her writing career took off in the late 1980s, with her debut novel, Remembrance (အမှတ်တရ), published in 1987. The bestseller novel stirred controversy for endorsing Western existentialist philosophy and portraying cohabitating unwed couples.

She published fifteen novels (most of them were adapted into films), seven collections of short stories and seven collections of articles on the environment. She currently works as a co-founder of an HIV positive children orphanage and also a participant in the HIV/AIDS Media Initiative and Yadana Metta Foundation. Her writings now focus on environmental conservation.

== Works ==
=== Novels ===
- 1987– AMhatTaya – (အမှတ်တရ)
- 1990– Myit Toe Ei Maryar – (မြစ်တို့၏ မာယာ)
- 1991– Kaung Kin Ma Par Thaw Nya and other short novels – (ကောင်းကင်မပါသောညနှင့် အခြားဝတ္ထုတိုများ)
- 1991– Kyae Mwa Twar Thaw Tain Tite Myar Akyaung – (ကြေမွသွားသော တိမ်တိုက်များအကြောင်း)
- 1992– Essential Rain – (မရှိမဖြစ်မိုး)
- 1993– Nanyan Ei Achar Taphat – (နံရံ၏ အခြားတစ်ဖက်)
- 1994– Main Ma Ta Yaut Ei Phwint Ha Win Khan Chat – (မိန်းမတစ်ယောက်၏ ဖွင့်ဟဝန်ခံချက်)
- 1994– Chit Chin Ei Anupyinnyar and other short novels – (ချစ်ခြင်း၏အနုပညာနှင့် အခြားဝတ္ထုတိုများ)
- 1995– Kankyamar Ko Ma Yone Kyi Kya Thu Myar – (ကံကြမ္မာကို မယုံကြည်ကြသူများ)
- 1996– Pinlae Nyint Tu Thaw MainMa Myar – (ပင်လယ်နှင့်တူသော မိန်းမများ)
- 1996– Myit Ta Sin Ko Phyat Kyaw Chin – (မြစ်တစ်စင်းကို ဖြတ်ကျော်ခြင်း)
- 1997– Kyar Tot Thi Lae Maung Sa Kar – (ကြာတော့သည်လည်း မောင့်စကား)
- 1997– My Tree – (ကျွန်မ၏ သစ်ပင်)
- 1997– Yar Sa Win Htae Mhar Maung Ko Htar Kae – (ရာဇဝင်ထဲမှာမောင့်ကိုထားခဲ့)
- 1997– Yae Myaw Thie – (ရေမျောသီး)
- 1997- Chit Thu Lar Sakar Ta Pwint Pwint Kat Tal- (ချစ်သူလား စကားတစ်ပွင့် ပွင့်ခဲ့တယ်)
- 1998– The Books I read- (ကျွန်မဖတ်ခဲ့သော စာအုပ်များ)
- 1999– Sayarwon Ta Yaut Ei Mhatsu Myar – (ဆရာဝန်တစ်ယောက်၏ မှတ်စုများ)
- 2000– Chit Thu Yae Tae Kyon Ma Ye Nya Twe- (ချစ်သူရေးတဲ့ ကျွန်မရဲ့ညတွေ)
- 2002- Kyal Sin Tatar Nint Kan Par Nin Phyu- (ကြယ်စင်တံတားနှင့် ကမ်းပါးနှင်းဖြူ)
- 2004- Tain Nae Chi Tae Kyoe- (တိမ်နဲ့ချည်တဲ့ကြိုး)
- 2006 - Saunt Nay Mal Lo MA Pyaw Lite Buu - (စောင့်နေမယ်လို့ မပြောလိုက်ဘူး)
- 2008– Thu Min Ko Bal Tot Mha – (သူမင်းကို ဘယ်တော့မှ)
- 2011– Let The More Loving One Be Me- (ပိုချစ်ရတဲ့သူ ကိုယ်ပဲဖြစ်ပါစေ)
- 2014- Sone Nay Yat Nae Lwan Lay Chin(ဆုံနေရက်နဲ့လွမ်းနေခြင်း)
- A Thit Sat Sat Htar Wa Ya ( အသစ္စက္စက္ထာ၀ရ)
- 2018- Lover's Blanket Knitted With Rainbow (သက်တံတို့ဖြင့် ရက်ဖွဲ့ ချစ်သူရဲ့ ခြုံလွှာ)

=== Novella ===
- Kye Taw Nyake Moe Kaw Chin (with Nay Win Myint) – (ကြည်းတော၌ မိုးခေါ်ခြင်း)
