= Diamond Plaza (Mandalay) =

- ဒိုင်းမွန်း ပလာဇာ
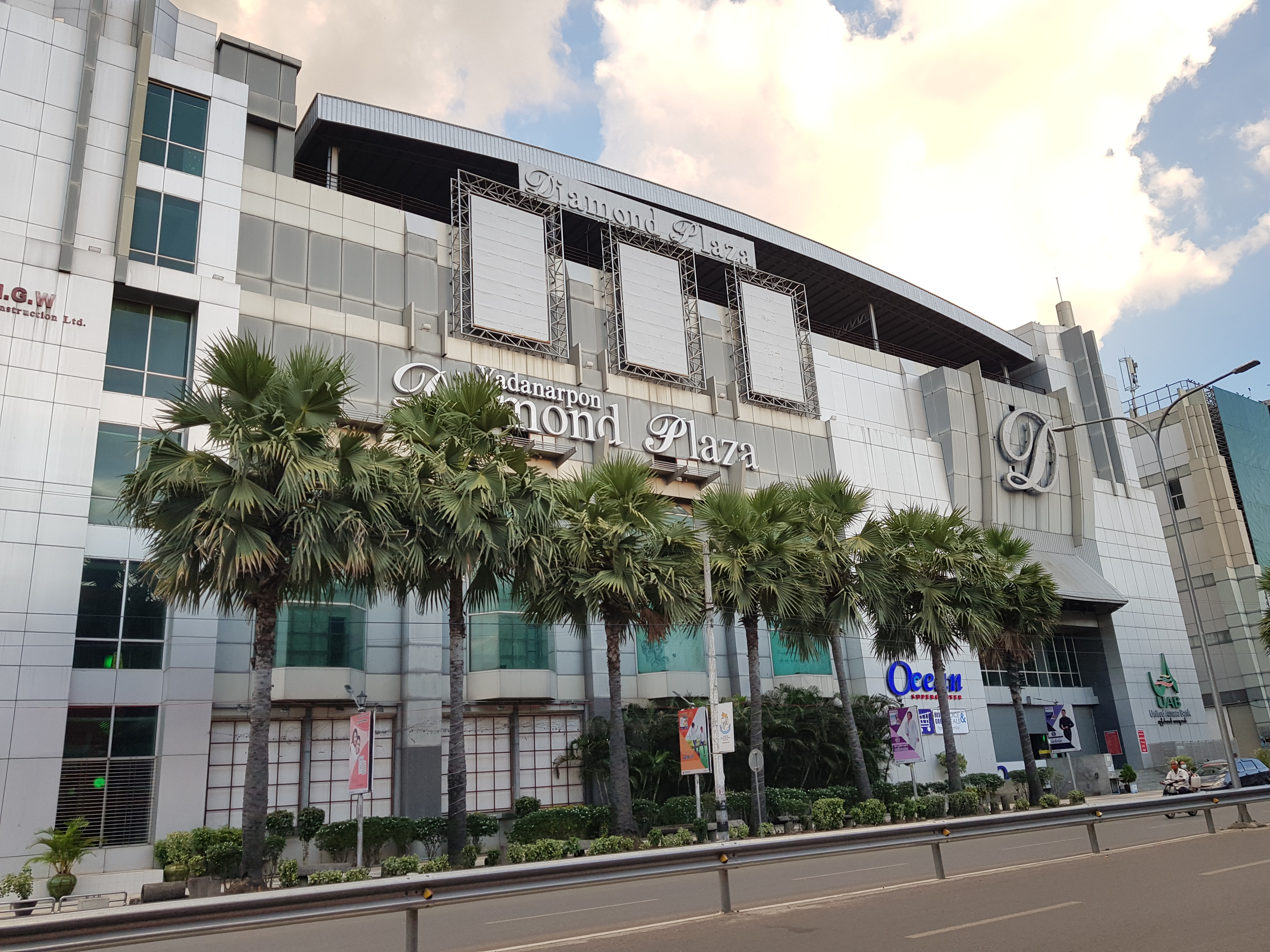
- Interactive map of the Diamond Plaza area

General information
- Type: Shopping Centre
- Location: 78th Road, bet. 33rd and 34th streets, Chanaye Thazan
- Coordinates: 21°58′18″N 96°05′06″E
- Construction started: 2010
- Opened: 15 August 2012
- Cost: US$40 million
- Owner: MCDC, MGW

Height
- Top floor: 6 (Diamond Plaza); 7 (Yadanabon Super Centre)

Technical details
- Lifts/elevators: 20

Design and construction
- Architecture firm: Process Myanmar Company
- Structural engineer: KMT group

Other information
- Number of rooms: 600 (Tower A), 323 (Tower B)
- Parking: Underground Parking and Ground Parking (600+ cars)

Website
- www.yadanarpondiamondplaza.com

Diamond Plaza (Burmese: ဒိုင်းမွန်း ပလာဇာ) is one of the biggest shopping centres in Mandalay, Myanmar. It is located in downtown Mandalay near the Mandalay Central Railway Station. The complex consists of two towers: Tower A (Diamond Plaza) and Tower B (Yadanabon Super Centre).
