= Sale, Myanmar =

Sale စလေ Salay
- Town
- Location within Myanmar
- Coordinates: 20.834588°N 94.750937°E
- Country: Myanmar (Burma)
- Region: Magway Region
- District: Magway District
- Township: Chauk Township
- Time zone: UTC+6:30 (MST)

Sale or Salay (Burmese: စလေမြို့) is a town located in Chauk Township, Magway District, Magway Region, Myanmar (Burma). Sale is located by the eastern bank of the Ayeyarwady River, and its nearest town is Chauk, which is about 21 kilometres (13 mi) away.

Sale developed as a satellite town of Bagan in the 12th and 13th centuries and is still an important religious center. Sale houses 50 active Buddhist monasteries, including the Yokesone Monastery, as well as Bagan-era monuments like the Man Buddha Image. Sale is a center for lacquerware manufacturing.

Sale is also known as the birthplace of U Ponnya, one of Burma's most celebrated writers.
