= Yokesone Monastery, Salay =

Burmese monastery

Yokesone Monastery
- စလေ ရုပ်စုံကျောင်း
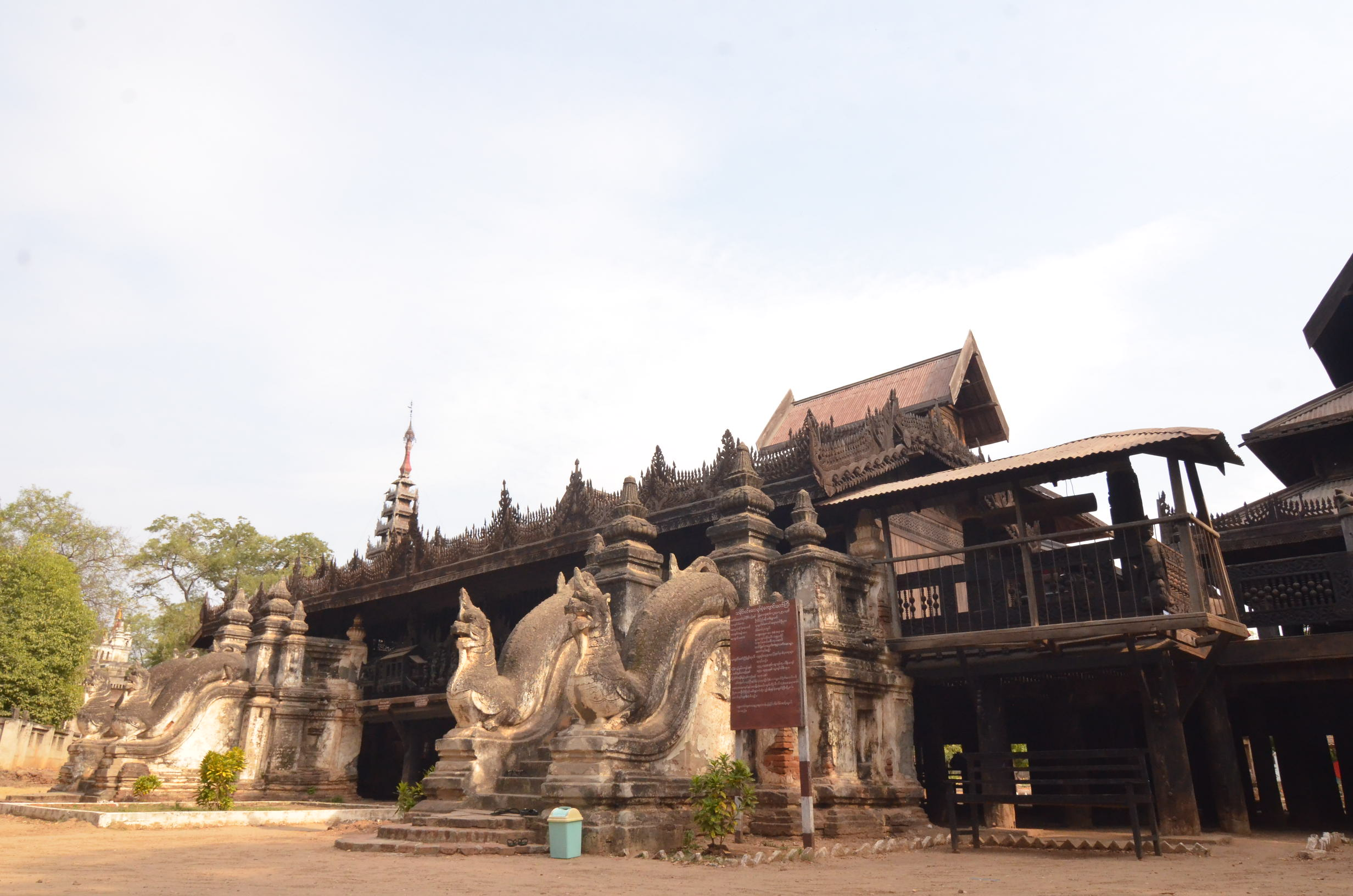

- Location within Myanmar

Religion
- Affiliation: Theravada Buddhism

Location
- Country: Sale, Magwe Region, Burma
- Interactive map of Yokesone Monastery
- Coordinates: 20.833398°N 94.745070°E

Architecture
- Completed: 1882; 144 years ago

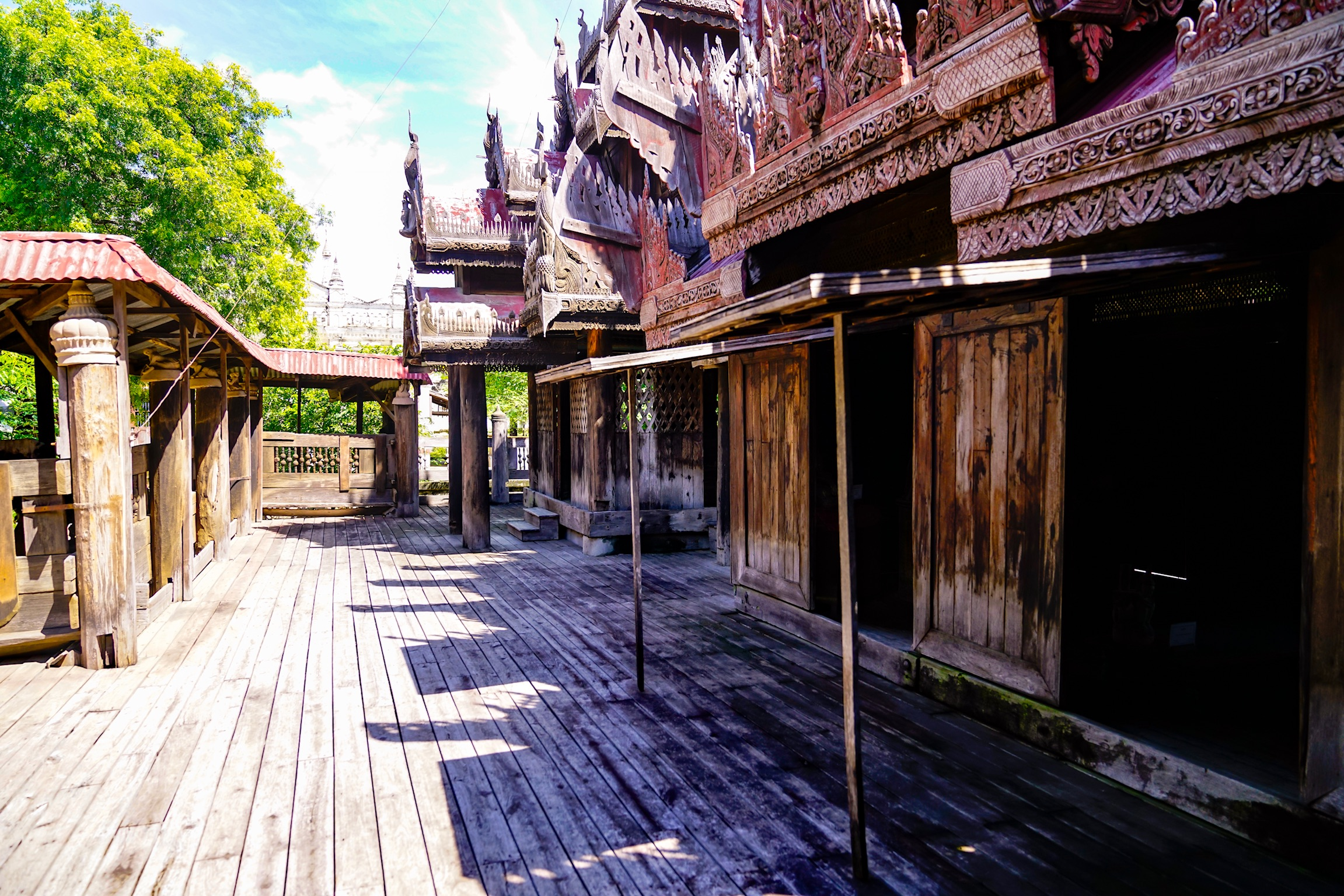
Rear deck of the Yokesone Monastery in Salay, Magwe Region, Myanmar. Building dates back to 1882

Yokesone Monastery (Burmese: စလေ ရုပ်စုံကျောင်း) is a historic Buddhist monastery in Sale, Magwe Region, Myanmar. The wooden monastery, which dates to 1882, is known for its abundance of woodcarvings which depict scenes of the Jataka tales. The monastery was constructed with 153 teak posts, each more than 3 feet in diameter, which hold the building up about 10 feet above the ground, during the time of King Thibaw. It housed monks from its construction until it was transformed into a museum in 1996. Aside from the carvings, guests can also view an ancient Buddha image and utensils of Yadanabon 19th century period. Additionally, the museum houses a plethora of unidentified sculptures, a large throne once used by leading monks, as well as an old wooden box that served as carriage for clergy members. Behind the monastery in a small building, work from the famous Burmese playwright and poet, as well as favorite bard in King Mindon's court, U Ponnya, also hailing from the area, are on display.

== See also ==
- Kyaung
