= Yadanabon Market =

Market in Mandalay, Myanmar

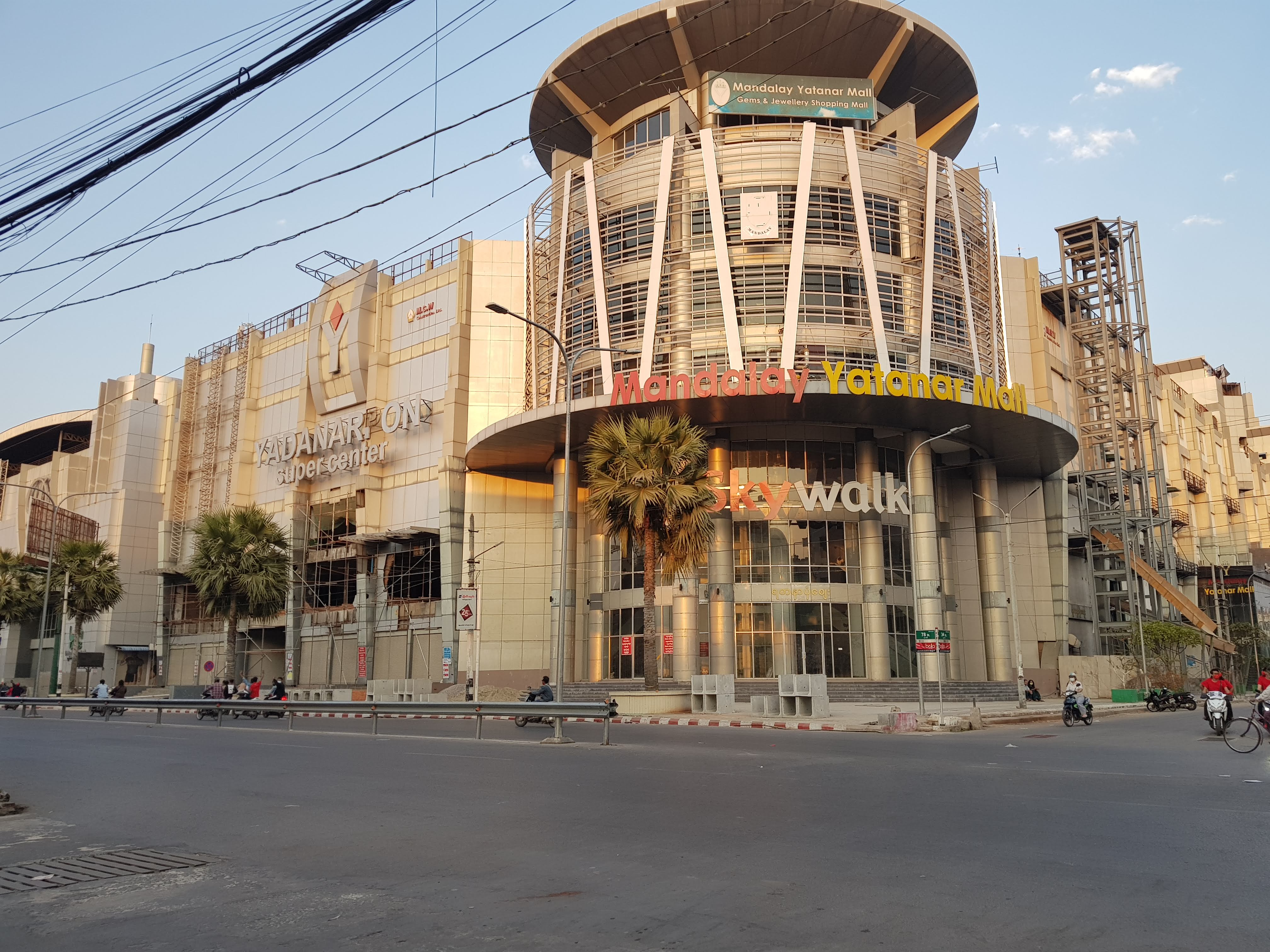
- Location: Mandalay, Myanmar; 21.971422°N 96.087434°E
- Interactive map of Yadanabon Market

Yadanabon Market (Burmese: ရတနာပုံဈေး) is the second-largest market of the city of Mandalay, Myanmar. It is between 77th and 33rd and 34th streets, near the Mandalay Central Railway Station. The market is now beside the Diamond Plaza.

The market was previously housed on the ground floor of Skywalk Shopping Mall, a five-story complex that included a shopping mall on the first floor and restaurants and offices of the Trading Association and MICT Park on the second floor. The shopping mall was built in 2003.

A massive fire destroyed Yadanabon Market in February 2008. The fire burned for 13 hours, destroying 1,558 shops and injuring 21 people.

Following the fire, the Mandalay City Development Committee (MCDC) cleared the site and reconstructed the entire area into a massive two-tower complex. Tower A became Diamond Plaza, and Tower B became the Yadanabon Super Centre (the new home of the market).

== Skywalk Fire ==
On January 17, 2020, at 6:08 P.M., a fire started within a segment of Yadanabon Market, better known as Skywalk. By 2:02 A.M. on January 18, the Myanmar Fire Department had contained the fire. The fire was later extinguished by 5:03 A.M. Approximately 200 fire engines were deployed to put out the flames.

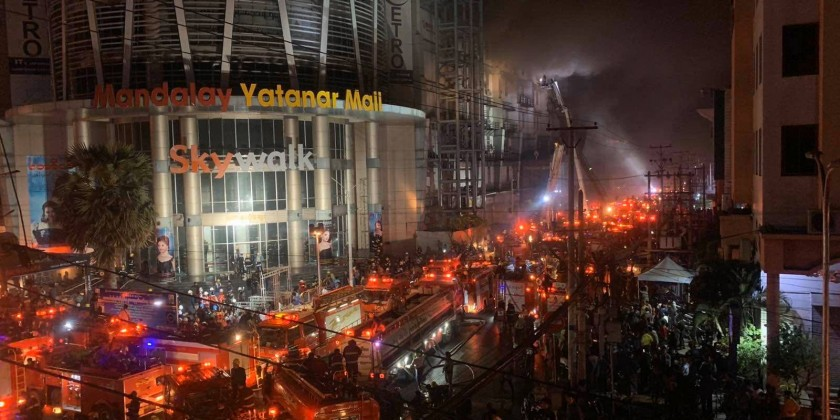
A photo taken by the Myanmar Fire Services Department during the Skywalk Fire.

Nearly 125 shops were burnt by the fire, and many people were injured. Estimates indicate that the fire had caused damage worth one billion kyats. Shortly after the fire occurred, speculations were made about the culprits who started the fire. Many fingers pointed at Giordano, a shoe store, and a lawsuit was filed against them. Giordano has since claimed not to have been the one who started the fire. Currently, the true culprit remains unknown.

Months after the fire, a construction team has been repairing the damage the fire caused to the Skywalk Mall; as of now, they have finished the roof. Skywalk is still closed and off-limits to the public.

== See also ==
- Zegyo Market
