= Chanayethazan Township =

Chanayethazan Township ချမ်းအေးသာစံ မြို့နယ်
- Township of Mandalay
- Chanayethazan Township
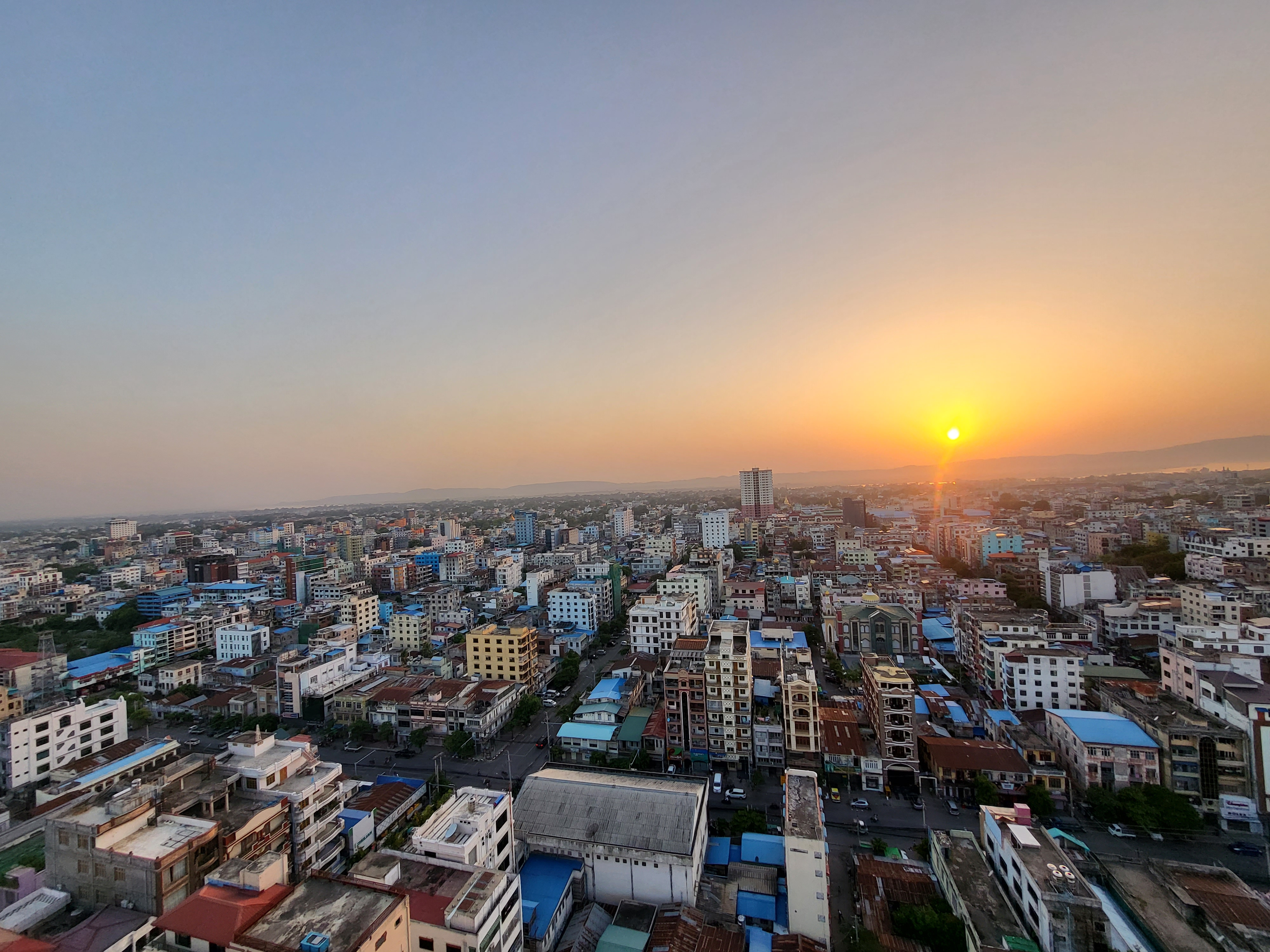

- Chanayethazan township in Mandalay district

- Location within Myanmar
- Coordinates: 21°58′0″N 96°5′0″E
- Country: Myanmar
- Division: Mandalay
- City: Mandalay
- Township: Chanayethazan
- Time zone: UTC6:30 (MST)
- Area codes: 2 (mobile: 69, 90)

Chanayethazan Township (Burmese: ချမ်းအေးသာစံ မြို့နယ်, pronounced [tɕʰáɰ̃ ʔé θà zàɰ̃ mjo̰nɛ̀]) is a township located in downtown Mandalay, Myanmar. The township is bounded by Aungmyethazan Township and the Mandalay Palace in the north, Patheingyi Township in the east, Maha Aungmye Township in the south, and the Ayeyarwady river in the west. Chanayethazan is the main business district of the city. It is home to the city's biggest shopping center, the Zegyo Market, and most international standard hotels.

== Notable places ==
- Bahtoo Stadium
- Htilin Monastery
- Mandalay Central Railway Station
- Mandalay General Hospital
- Myodaw Garden
- Police Academy of Mandalay
- University of Medicine, Mandalay
- Yadanabon Market
- Zegyo Market
- Mandalay City Development Committee
