= Mandalay General Hospital =

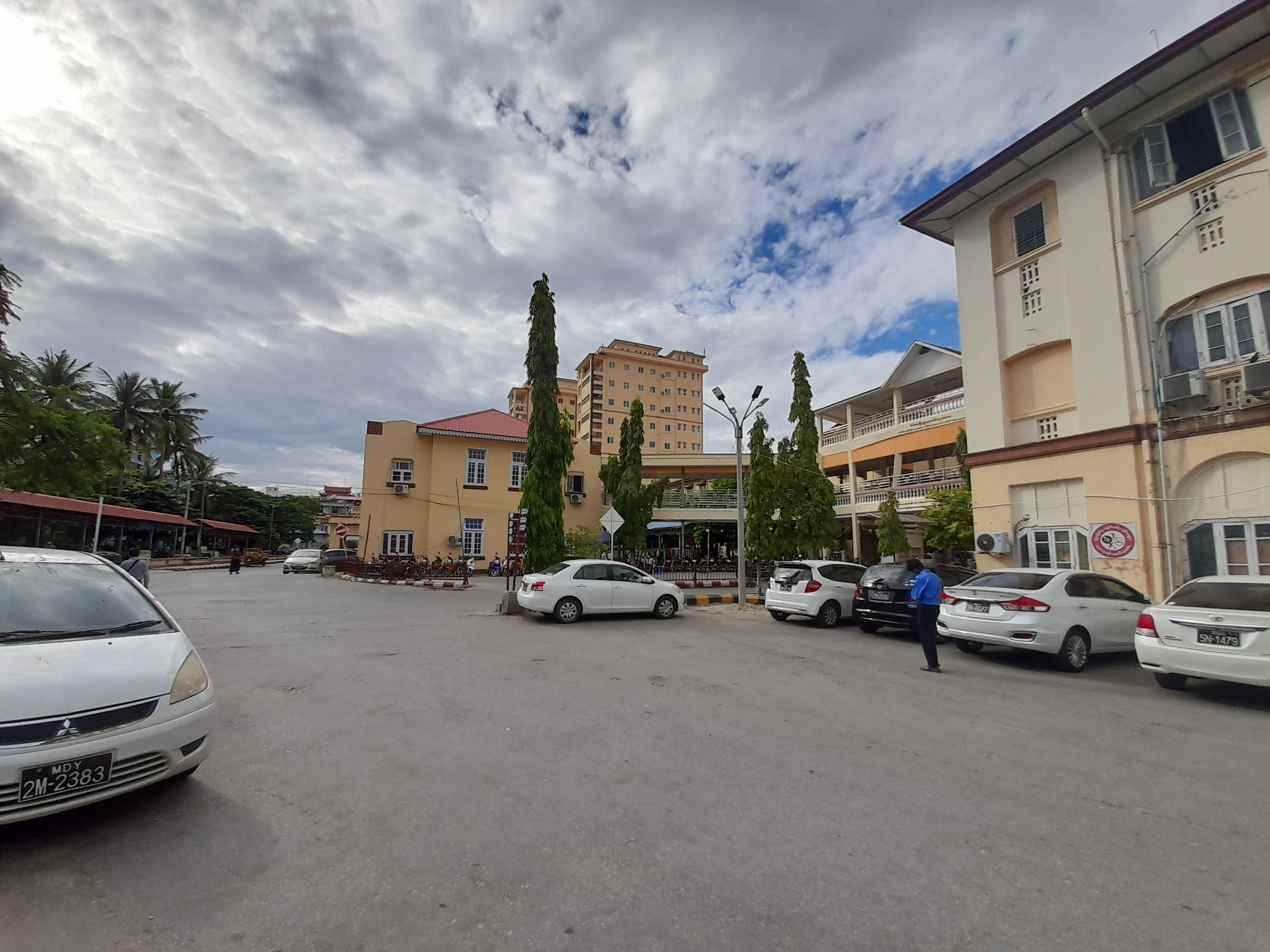

Geography
- Location: Chanayethazan Township, Mandalay, Mandalay Region, Myanmar
- Coordinates: 21°58′39″N 96°05′26″E

Organisation
- Type: Teaching
- Affiliated university: University of Medicine, Mandalay

Services
- Beds: 1,000

History
- Founded: 1887

Links
- Lists: Hospitals in Myanmar

Mandalay General Hospital (Burmese: မန္တလေးပြည်သူ့ဆေးရုံကြီး; abbreviated MGH) is a major teaching hospital in Mandalay, Myanmar, with a bed capacity of 1,500. It serves as the primary teaching institution for University of Medicine, Mandalay, alongside Mandalay Workers' Hospital. It is located on 30th Street, between 74th and 77th Streets in Chanayethazan Township. The hospital treats over 1,200 patients per day.

Mandalay General Hospital was founded in 1887 by the British authorities as a civil medical establishment for Upper Burma.

In 2013, Mandalay General Hospital began a major expansion project, at a cost of US$2.88 million, to construct a 10-storey building to house an additional 500 beds. The building was inaugurated on 28 March 2015.

== Departments ==
MGH maintains both medical and surgical specialist departments and diagnostic departments.

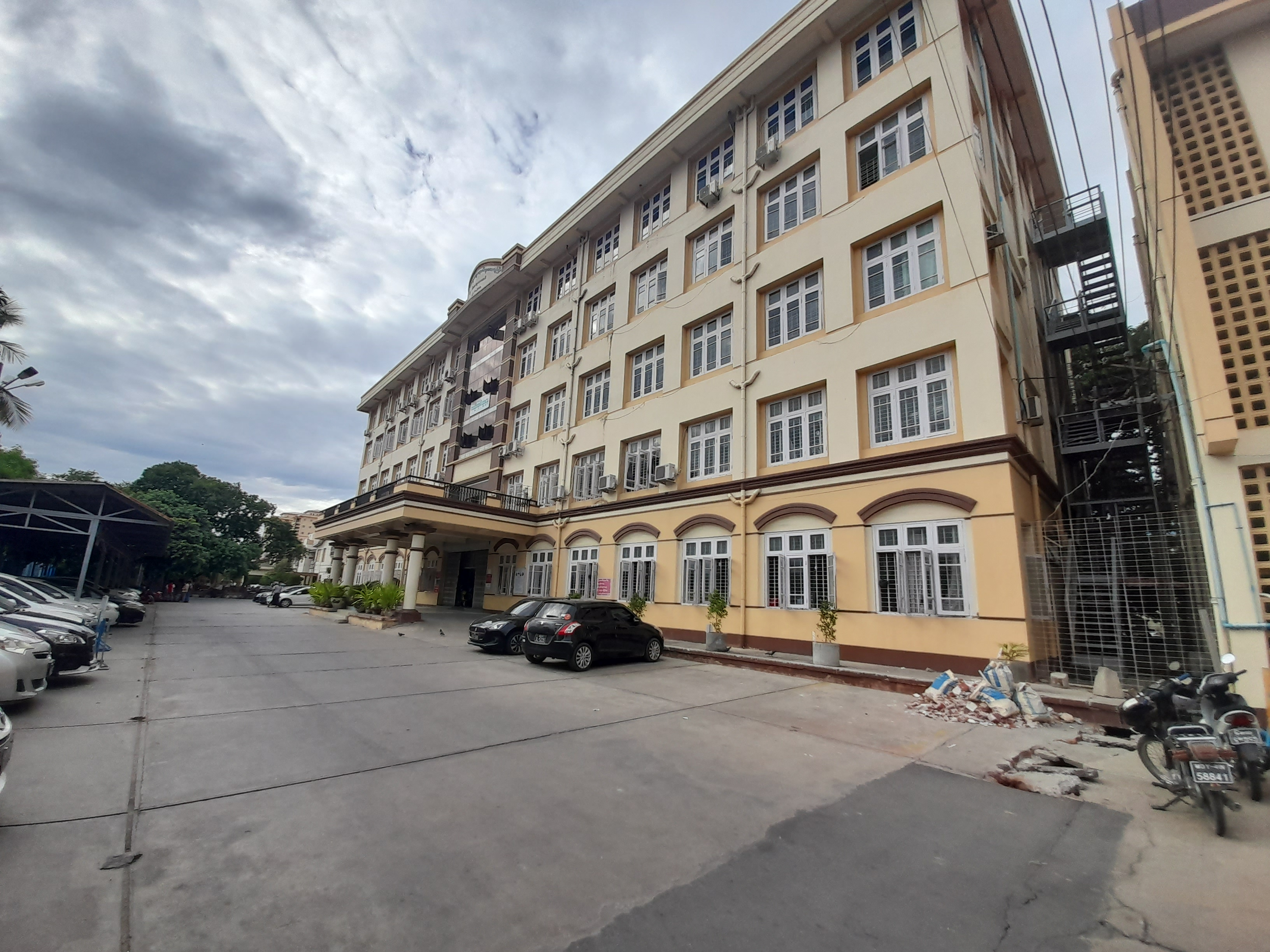
Medical Unit 3

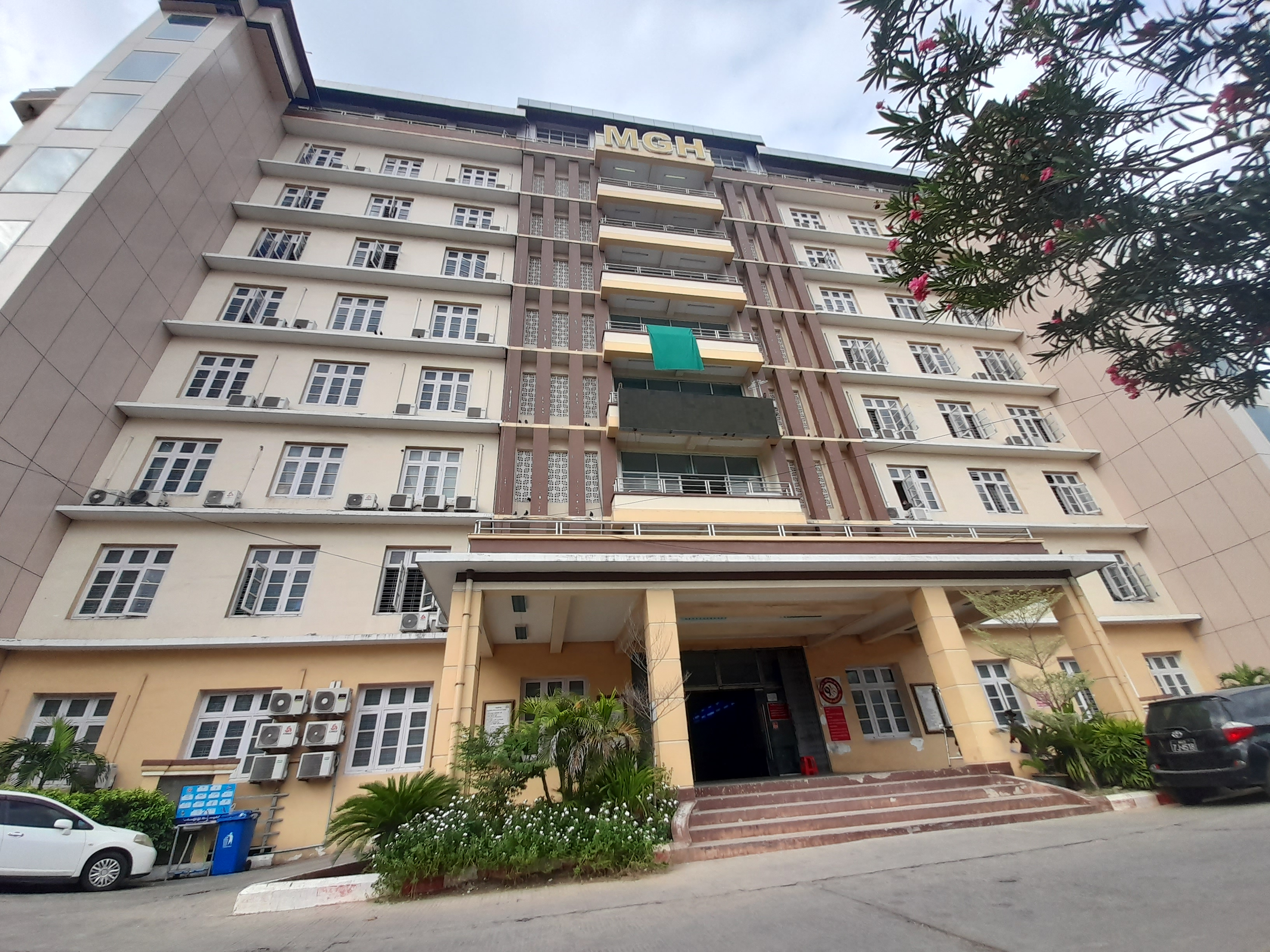
Medical Unit 1&2

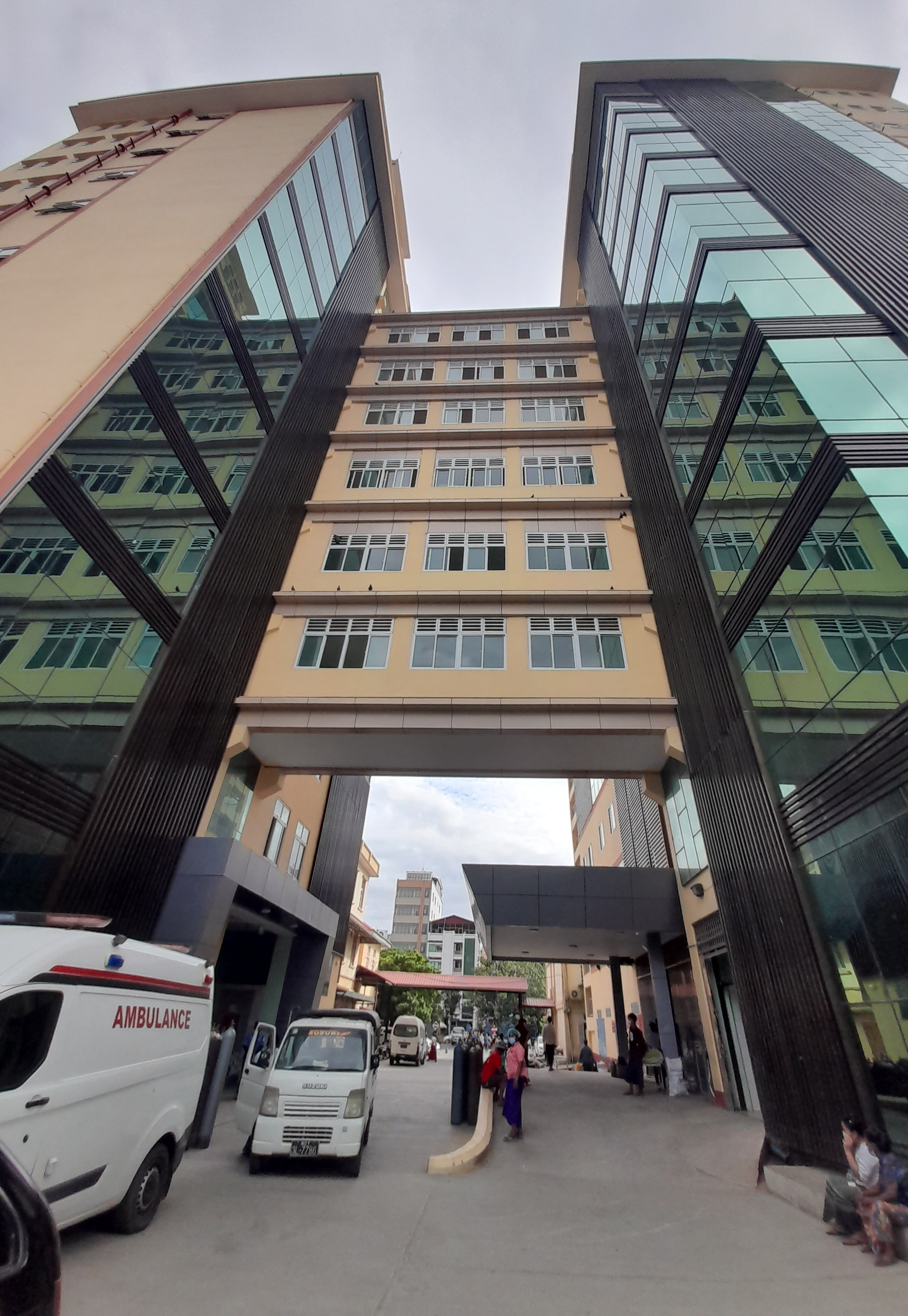
10 storey Unit

=== Specialist departments ===
- Department of Anaesthesiology and Intensive Care Medicine
- Department of Cardiovascular Medicine
- Department of Cardiovascular Surgery
- Department of Clinical Haematology
- Department of Dermatology
- Department of Diabetes and Endocrinology
- Department of Emergency Medicine
- Department of Gastroenterology
- Department of Hepatology
- Department of Hepatobiliary and Pancreatic Surgery
- Department of Medical Oncology
- Department of Nephrology
- Department of Neurology
- Department of Neurosurgery
- Department of Plastic, Maxillofacial & Oral Surgery
- Department of Physical Medicine & Rehabilitation
- Department of Radiation Oncology
- Department of Respiratory Medicine
- Department of Rheumatology
- Department of Thoracic Surgery
- Department of Tropical and Infectious Diseases
- Department of Urology
- General Medical Units (1, 2 & 3)
- General Surgical Units (1, 2 & 3)
- Trauma care unit
- Upper Myanmar Heart Centre
- Intensive Care Cardiovascular Unit (Cardiac Intensive Care Unit and Coronary Care Unit (CCU))
- Diagnostic and Therapeutic Cardiovascular Catheterisation Laboratories
- Operation Theatres
- Heart Failure Clinic
- Cardiac Rehabilitation Clinic
- Special Skin Clinic
- Diabetic Clinic
- Dentistry Clinic
- Mental Health Clinic
- Acute Burn Care Unit
- Isolation Ward
- Pain and Palliative Care Unit

=== Diagnostics departments ===
- Department of Radiology (MRI, CT, Xray, USS)
- Department of Pathology
- Department of Microbiology
- Department of Nuclear Medicine
- Diagnostic Cardiovascular Catheterisation Laboratories
- Non-invasive Cardiovascular Diagnostic Lab
- Endoscopy Centre
- Neuroelectrophyisological Centre

=== Auxiliary departments ===
- Department of Forensic Medicine
- Blood Bank
- Medical Record Department
- Bio-Medical Engineering Department
- Kitchen
- Laundry
- Motor Transport

== Clinical training ==
=== Undergraduate ===
- M.B., B.S. degree

=== Diploma ===
- Dip.Med.Sc.
  - TB and Chest Diseases
  - Family Medicine
  - Primary Emergency Care
  - Clinical Pharmacology
  - STD
  - Transfusion Medicine

=== Graduate ===
- M.Med.Sc. degree
  - Pathology
  - Microbiology
  - Medical Jurisprudence
  - Orthopaedics and Traumatology
  - Anaesthesia
  - Radiology
  - Physical Medicine and Rehabilitation
  - Dermatology
  - Internal Medicine
  - Surgery
  - Cardiovascular Surgery
  - Neurosurgery
  - Plastic, Maxilofacial and Oral Surgery
  - Thoracic Surgery
  - Urology

=== Doctorate ===
- Dr.Med.Sc. degree
  - General Medicine
  - General Surgery
  - Orthopaedics and Traumatology
  - Cardiology
  - Cardiovascular Surgery
  - Neurology
  - Neurosurgery
  - Gastroenterology
  - Hepatology
  - Hepatobiliary and Pancreatic Surgery
  - Endocrinology
  - Rheumatology
  - Nephrology
  - Respiratory Medicine
  - Clinical Haematology
  - Anaesthesia
  - Radiology
  - Physical Medicine and Rehabilitation
  - Plastic, Maxillo-facial and Oral Surgery
  - Thoracic Surgery
  - Urology

=== Nursing ===
- Nursing Training

=== Medical Technology ===
- Medical Technology
  - Medical Imaging Technology or Radiography
  - Physiotherapy
  - Medical Laboratory Technology
