= Yadanabon Hall =

Military owned building in Mandalay

Coordinates: 21°57′49.1″N 96°05′12.6″E

- ရတနာပုံခန်းမ
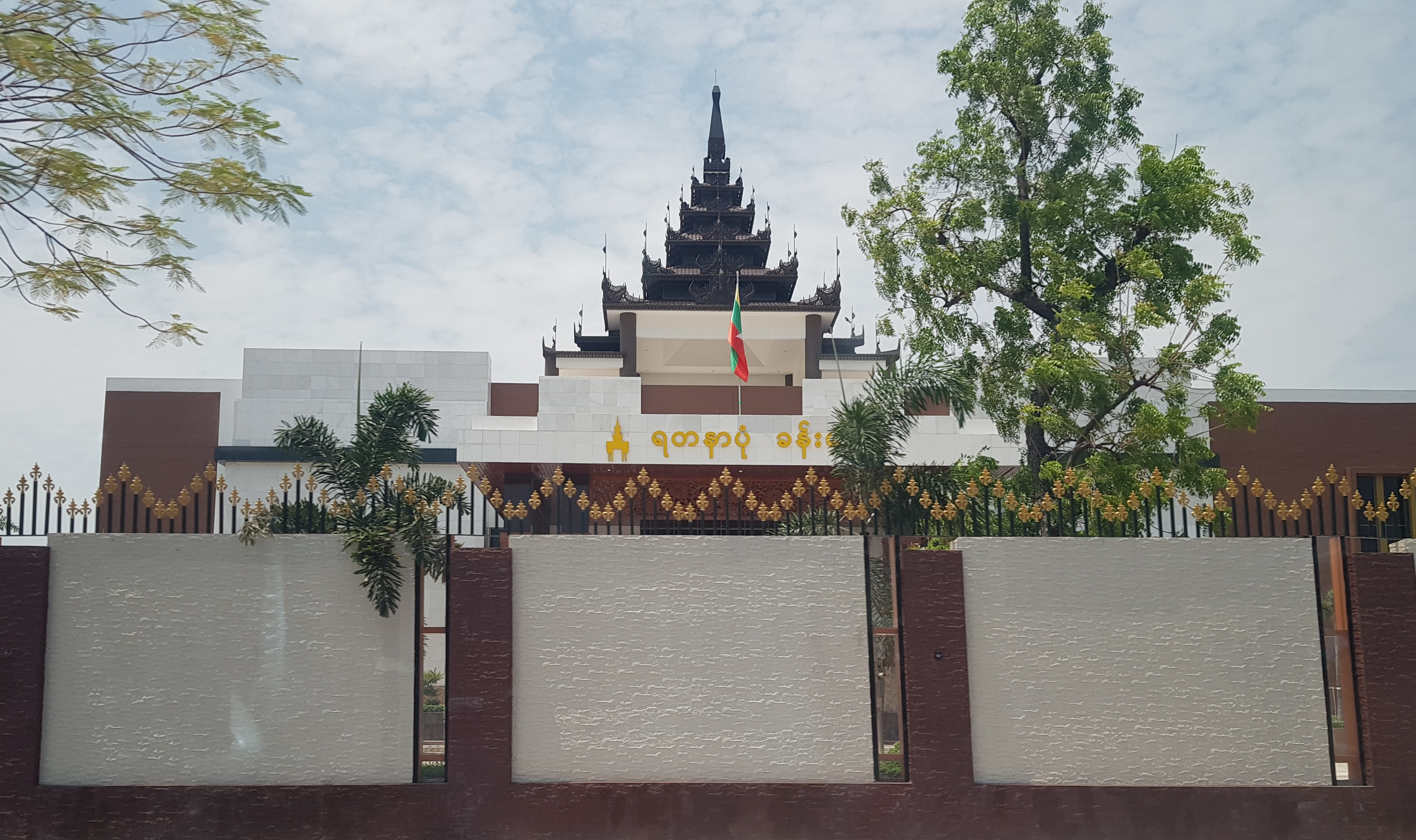
- Yadanabon Hall in May 2021
- Interactive map of the Yadanabon Hall area

General information
- Location: corner of 78th Road and 38th Street, Maha Aungmye Township, Mandalay
- Construction started: 17 February 2018
- Opened: 17 May 2021
- Owner: Tatmadaw

Height
- Top floor: 2nd floor

Yadanabon Hall (Burmese: ရတနာပုံခန်းမ) is a military-owned building in Mandalay.It is located in Maha Aungmye Township, Mandalay.It is the largest Hall in Mandalay.

== History ==
In 2016, it was decided to build a new pavilion in Mandalay to provide modern services due to the changing population and rising living standards, despite the presence of halls in Mandalay.It was launched on 17 February 2018, completed on 30 November 2020 and opened on 17 May 2021 by Commander-in-Chief of Defence Services and Chairman of SAC Min Aung Hlaing.The site is located on a military base in the city center, at the corner of 38th Street, abandoned by the Tatmadaw, and 78th Street, the city's main road.

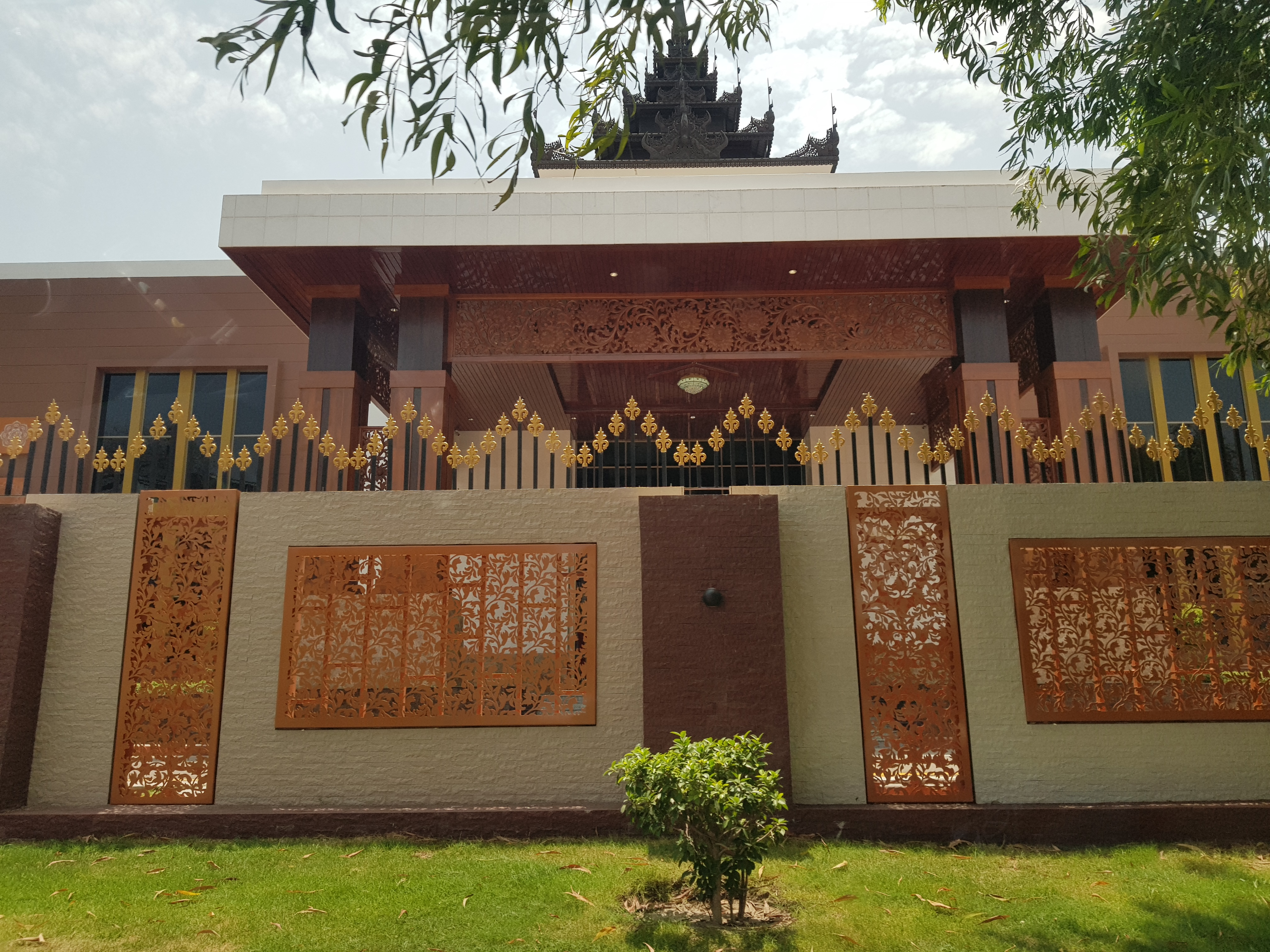
Yadanabon Hall

== Criticism ==
Following the 2021 coup, protests against the military and anti-authoritarian protests were staged by the Mandalay Citizens, Myoma Amateur Instrument Band, founded by Myoma Nyein, which is recognized as an icon of the city attended and performed in the opening ceremony. They were criticized by the citizens.
