= University of Medicine, Mandalay =

Educational facility in Myanmar

- ဆေးတက္ကသိုလ် (မန္တလေး)
- Motto: ဥပဌာနံ၊ အနုကမ္ပာ၊ ဒယာ (Pali: upaṭhānaṃ, anukammā, dayā)
- Motto in English: Service, Sympathy, Humanity
- Type: Public
- Established: 1954; 72 years ago
- Affiliations: Ministry of Health
- Rector: Vacant
- Administrative staff: 426
- Students: 2086
- Location: Chanayethazan, Mandalay, Myanmar; 21°58′32″N 96°05′39″E
- Website: https://ummdy.com

The University of Medicine, Mandalay (Burmese: ဆေးတက္ကသိုလ် (မန္တလေး), pronounced [sʰé tɛʔkəθò (máɰ̃dəlé)]; formerly Institute of Medicine, Mandalay), located in Mandalay is one of five medical universities in Myanmar. The university offers Bachelor of Medicine, Bachelor of Surgery (M.B., B.S.) degree and postgraduate degrees (diploma, master's and doctoral) in medical science.

The university is one of the most selective in the country, and accepts approximately 350 students annually based solely on their University Entrance Examination scores. The university is recognized by the Educational Commission for Foreign Medical Graduates.

== History ==
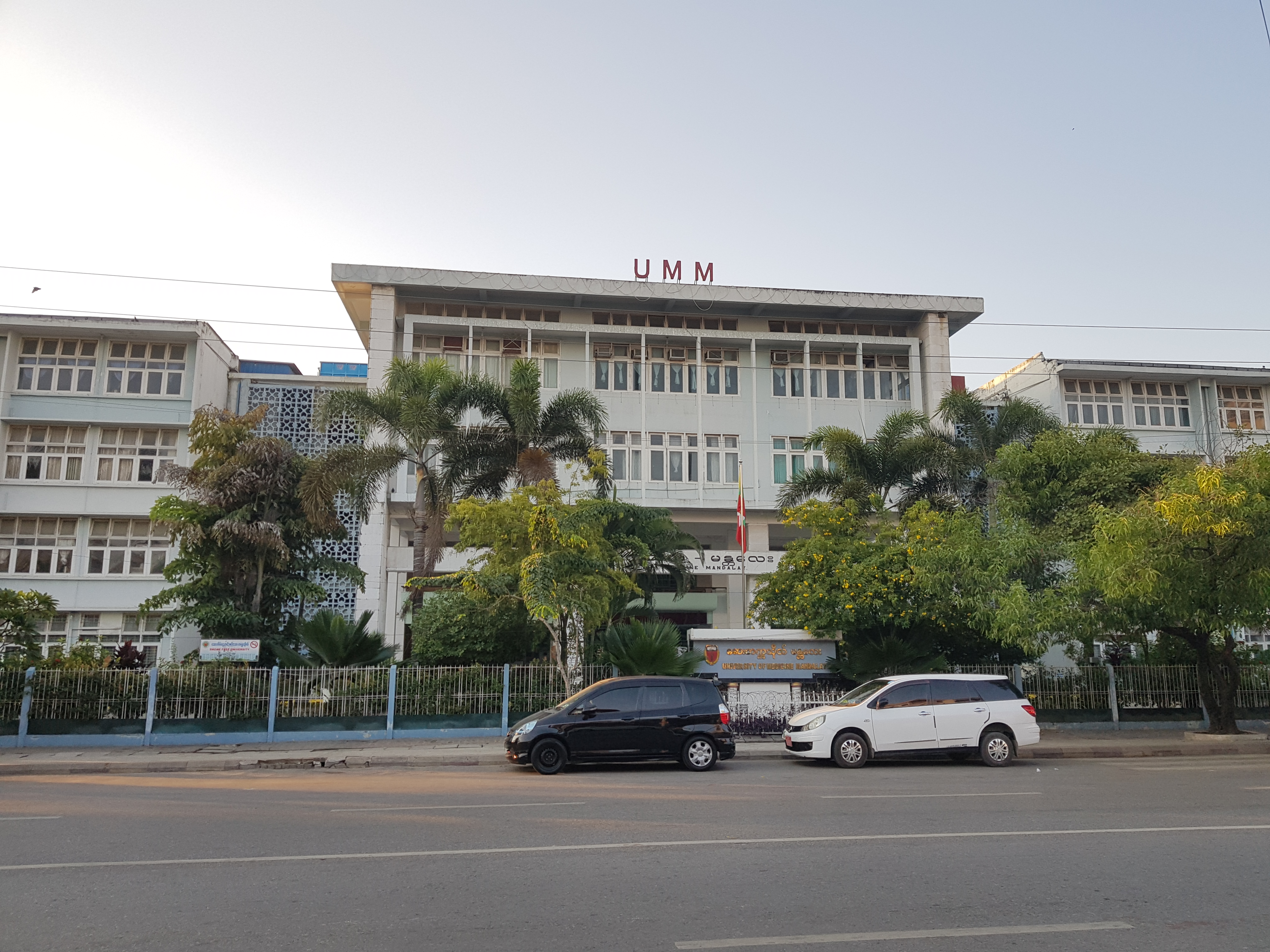
Main Building of UMM

The University of Medicine, Mandalay began as a Branch Medical Faculty (BMF) of the University of Rangoon in 1954, which in 1958 became the Faculty of Medicine, Mandalay. In 1964, it became an independent Institute of Medicine, Mandalay, offering an undergraduate M.B., B.S. program to an inaugural class of 36 students. Graduate programs began in 1968 with a master's degree program in physiology. The formal name, Institute of Medicine, Mandalay, was changed in 2005 to the University of Medicine, Mandalay. The university now offers a number of graduate diploma, master's, and doctoral programs.

The departments were established in phases:

- Departments of Anatomy and Physiology in 1954
- Departments of Pharmacology, Pathology, Bacteriology, Medicine and Surgery in 1956
- Departments of Obstetrics and Gynaecology, Forensic Medicine and Eye, Ear, Nose and Throat in 1957
- Department of Microbiology in 1960
- Department of Child Health, Burmese, English, Chemistry, Physics, Zoology and Botany in 1964
- Department of Biochemistry in 1987
- Department of Orthopedics in 1990

== Campus ==
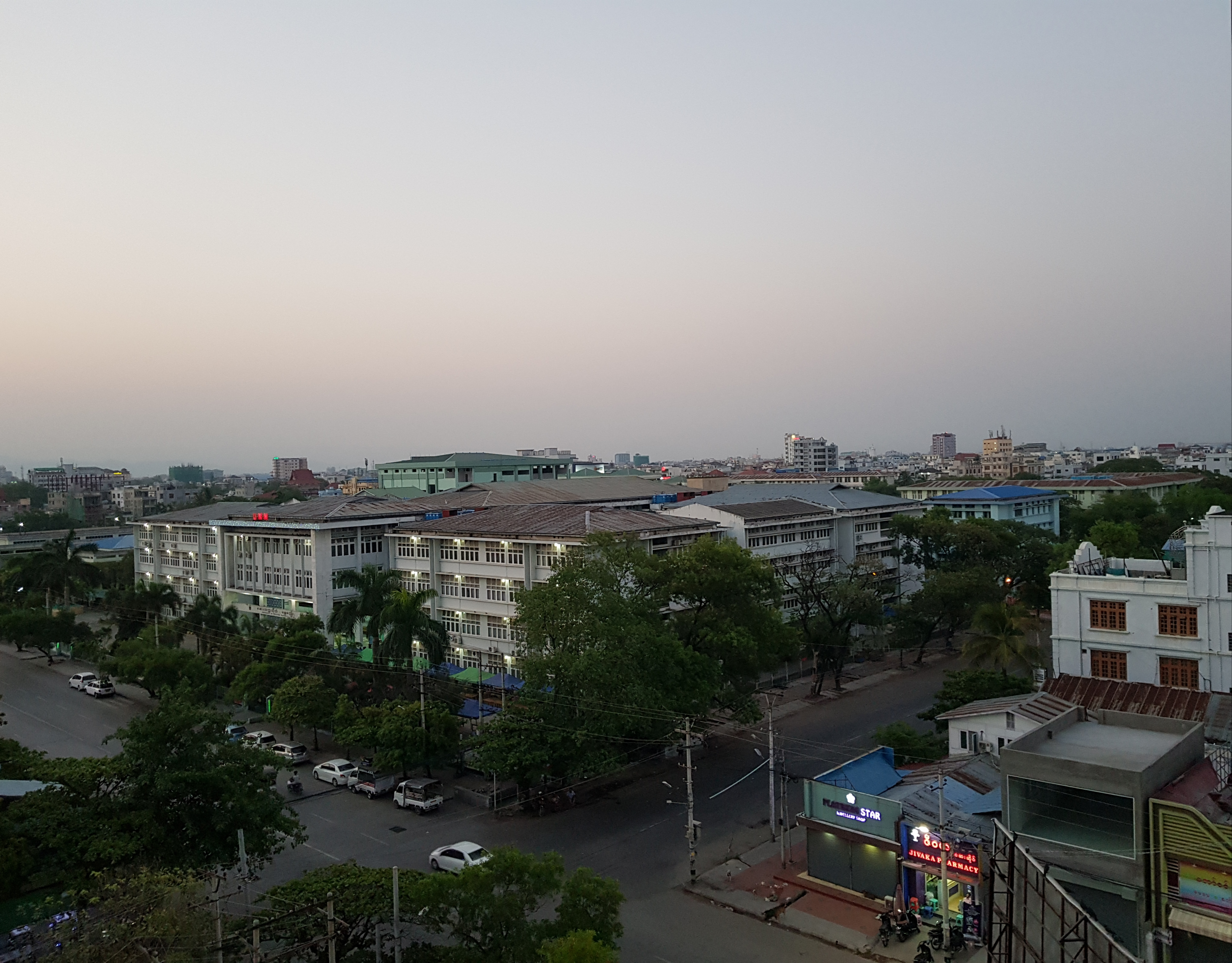
UMM campus

The university has been at its present site in Chanayethazan since 1955. The current building complex was completed in 1991. The Mandalay General Hospital (MGH) and the Mandalay Workers' Hospital have been the university's main teaching hospitals since the beginning. Today, the university also uses a 300-bed Teaching Hospital and five specialist hospitals in the city of Mandalay, and five regional general hospitals around the city - 13 hospitals in total.

== Admissions ==
The University of Medicine, Mandalay is one of the most selective schools in the country. The school admits about 300 students per year based solely on their University Entrance Examination scores.

== Programs ==
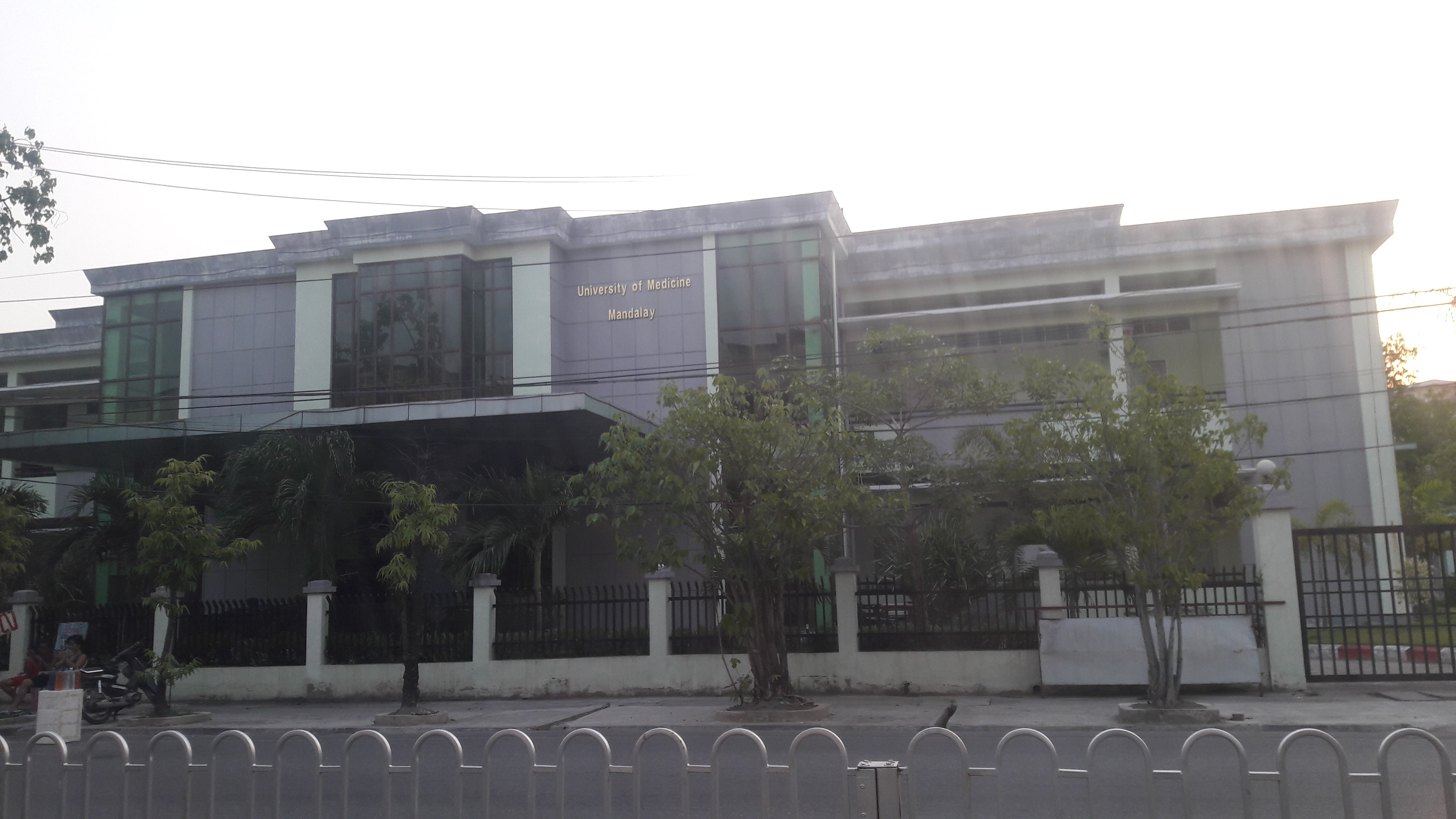
Aung Pinle Hall

The university is one of three universities in Myanmar that offers undergraduate, graduate and doctoral degrees.

- Bachelor of Medicine and Bachelor of Surgery (M.B., B.S.)
- Diploma in Medical Science (Dip.Med.Sc.)
- Master of Medical Science (M.Med.Sc.) physiology, anatomy, biochemistry, microbiology, pharmacology, pathology, public health, forensic medicine, internal medicine, surgery, obstetrics and gynaecology, pediatrics, orthopedics, rehabilitation medicine, anaesthesiology, radiology, otorhinolaryngology, ophthalmology, mental health, medical rehabilitation.
- Doctor of Medical Science (Dr.Med.Sc.)

medicine, surgery, obstetrics and gynaecology, pediatrics, orthopedics, rehabilitation medicine, cardiac surgery, cardiology, neurology, neurosurgery, radiology, anaesthesiology, ophthalmology, otorhinolaryngology, urology, renal medicine, forensic medicine, gastroenterology, paediatric surgery

- Ph.D.

Anatomy, physiology, biochemistry, microbiology, pharmacology, pathology, public health

== Notable alumni ==
- Ju (writer)
- Sai Mauk Kham
- Sai Kham Leik
- Soe Lwin
- Khin Maung Win
- Myint Maung Maung (Ob Gyn Scientist writer)

== See also ==
- List of universities in Myanmar
- Medical Universities (Myanmar)
