= Zegyo Market =

- ဈေးချို
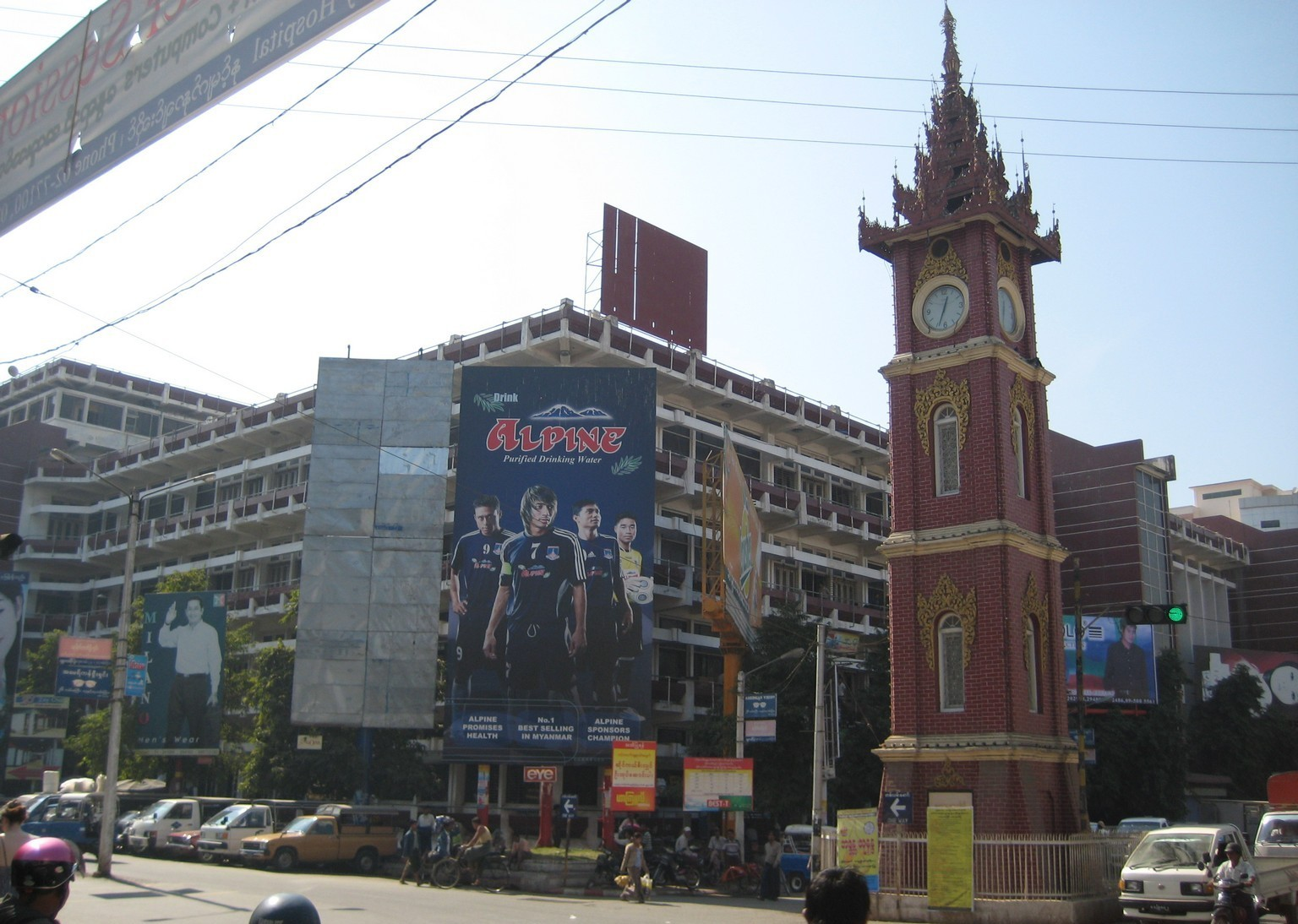
- Location: 84th St between 24th and 26th Streets; Chanayethazan, Mandalay; Mandalay Division, Myanmar
- Coordinates: 21°58′57″N 96°04′38″E
- Opened: 1860s
- Floors: 4

Zegyo Market (Burmese: ဈေးချို), located in central Mandalay, in Myanmar, is the oldest and most important market in the city.

== History ==
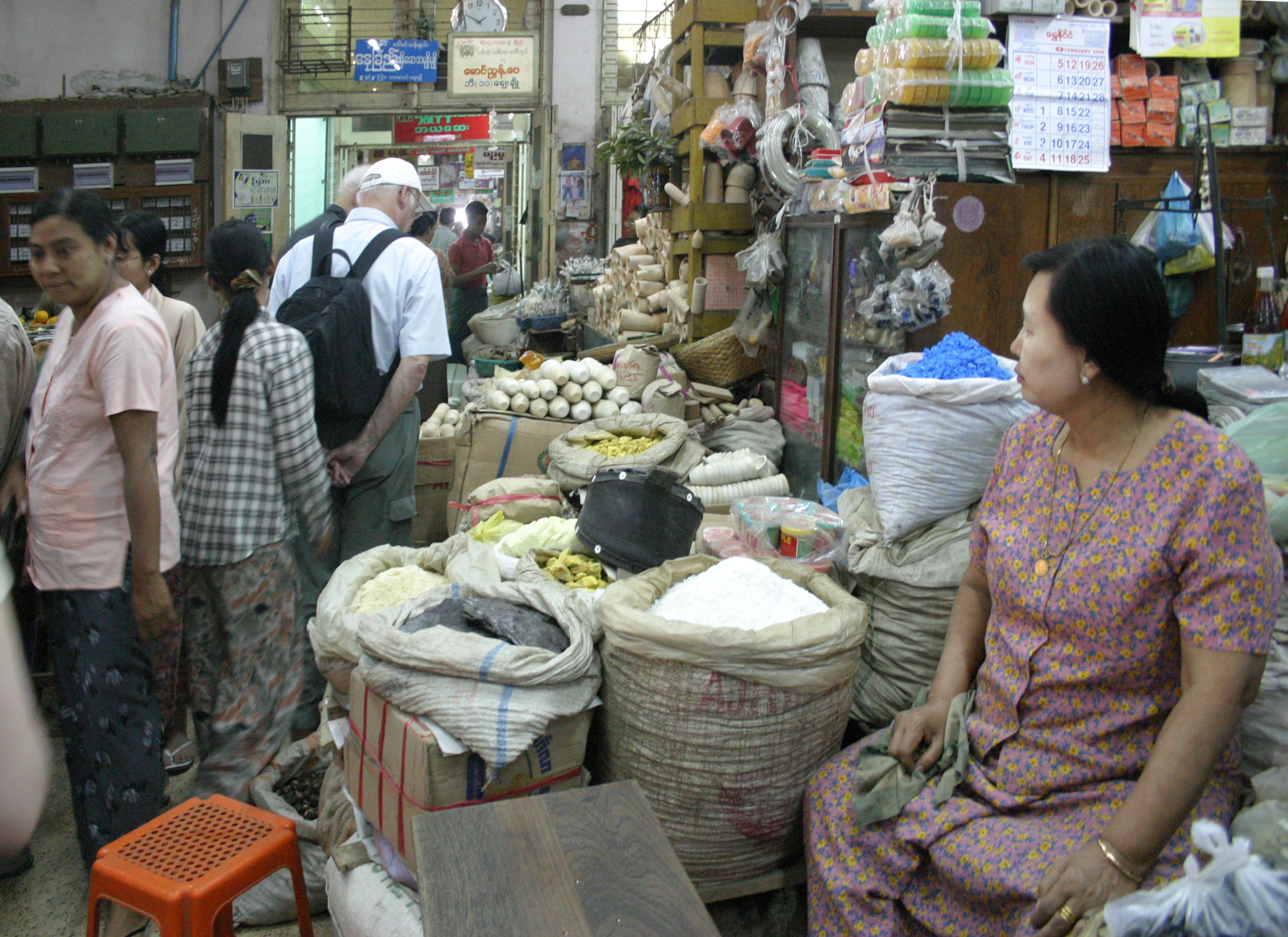
Inside the market, 2006

Zegyo Market, covering 12 acres (4.86 hectares), was founded in the 1860s during the reign of King Mindon. It was a principal distribution centre for beans, citrus fruit, cotton, nuts, onions, rice, tobacco and wheat, as well as the main market for jewellery and handicrafts such as silver and gold embroidery. The market was destroyed by fire in 1897, and rebuilt in 1903 with a masonry structure designed by an Italian, Count Conte Calderari. In the 1990s, the colonial-era structure was pulled down and replaced with a Chinese-style shopping centre.
