= Mandalay Gazette =

American Burmese language newspaper

Myanmar Gazette ရတနာပုံ နေပြည်တော် သတင်းစာ
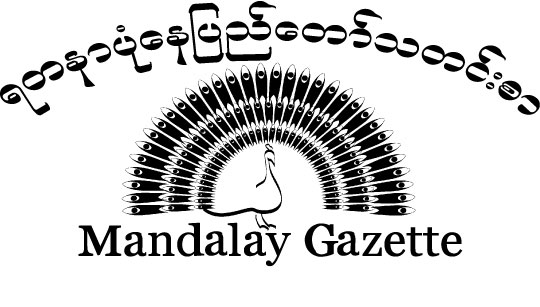
- Editor in Chief: Gyi Soe
- Categories: Newspaper
- Frequency: Monthly
- Circulation: 12,000 copies
- Publisher: Myanmar Gazette D.B.A.
- First issue: July 2006
- Country: California, United States
- Based in: Arcadia, California
- Language: Burmese
- Website: mandalaygazette.com

The Myanmar Gazette (Burmese: ရတနာပုံ နေပြည်တော် သတင်းစာ; Yadanabon Naypyidaw Thadinza) is a San Gabriel Valley-based Burmese language newspaper intended for overseas Burmese, with a primary focus on Burma-related news in the United States and Canada. The monthly paper has a total circulation of 12,000, and is distributed in major cities across the US and Canada with sizable Burmese populations. The paper's secondary target audience includes overseas Burmese in Asia, mainly Thailand, Malaysia, Singapore and Japan.

The typical coverage of the paper is a mix of Burmese American community news, Burmese celebrity interviews, and US and world news. The paper, usually 28 to 32 pages long, devoted a considerable number of pages to Cyclone Nargis coverage. The freely distributed paper also contains a number of Burmese American advertisements. The paper uses the tabloid format.

== History ==
The paper was founded in 2006 by two Los Angeles-based Burmese-Americans, Thakhin Kai Bwor and George Kyaw. . The paper's mission purportedly is to "promote networking amongst Burmese Americans towards a more civic-minded community". The first issue was published in July 2006. The company has established scholarships for local students and actively pursues its mission of improving literacy and education in local youth.

== Team members ==
- Chair: Phillip Zaw-Htun Kaw
- Editor in Chief: Gyi Soe
- Publisher: Myanmar Gazette D.B.A.
- Editors: Nyo Khet Kyaw, Saung Oo Pan, Min Let
- Design Director: Kai
- Contributing Writer: Maung Moe Nyo, Miemie Winn Byrd, Ed.D.
- Advertising Director: Swe Swe Aye
- Japan Representative: Sein Zaw Than
- Myanmar Representative: Ko Ko Latt
