= Myoma Nyein =

Burmese musician and composer

Alinka Kyawswa Myoma Nyein
- မြို့မငြိမ်း
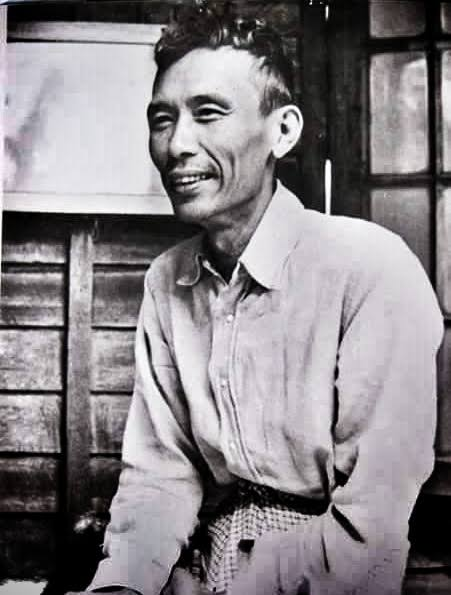
- Born: Kyaw Nyein; 25 January 1909; Mandalay, British Burma
- Died: 15 September 1955 (aged 46); Mandalay, Burma
- Occupations: Musician; composer
- Spouse: Than May (1928-1955)
- Children: Tin Kyi; Shun Myaing; Than Aung Khaing
- Parent(s): Nyi; Chit Oo
- Awards: Alinkar Kyawswar

Myoma Nyein (မြို့မငြိမ်း; born Kyaw Nyein, 25 January 1909 – 15 September 1955) was a renowned Burmese musician and composer. He was a founder of Myoma Band, the longest surviving music band in the modern Burmese history. Between 1935 and 1939, he recorded over 40 albums and composed a couple of Myanmar New Year (Thingyan) songs that became iconic, performed on Myoma's Silver Swan parade floats, which became a trademark of Thingyan celebration in Mandalay.

== Early life and education ==
Nyein was born on 25 January 1909 in Mandalay, British Burma, son of U Nyi, a goldsmith, and mother Daw Chit Oo, a lacquerware merchant. He was educated at Central National School, Mandalay.

At the age of ten, he learnt a Burmese classic titled "Jambu Kyun Lone" (Universal) from Deva Einda Maung Maung Gyi in a single day much to the surprise of the famous harpist. In 1925, he co-founded the Myoma (meaning 'City Proper') music band or Myoma Amateur Music Association with his teacher artist and musician U Ba Thet and a city burgher Dahdan U Thant.

== Repertoire ==
Myoma Nyein's greatest love song was "Chit Da Phadana" (Love is Fundamental), the gramophone recording made circa 1935–1938.

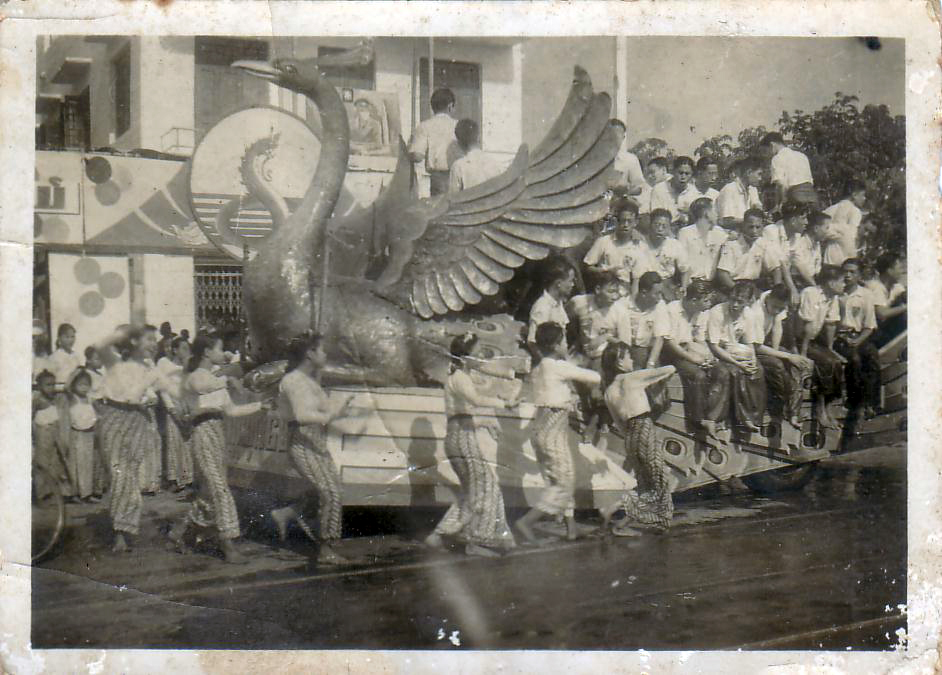
Myoma Troupe in 1958

One of his earlier songs written in 1939 was "Eindawya Paya Zay" in support of Mandalay's central Zegyo Market shopkeepers' all out strike against Section 23(7) enacted by the British colonial government when they relocated to the Eindawya Pagoda precincts.

During the Second World War, the music troupe along with the townspeople of Mandalay fled to Sagaing Hills across the Ayeyarwady River, and Myoma Nyein came up with the song "Sagaing Taung" (Sagaing Hills) among others.

After the war in 1945, when Mandalay held a major sporting event, Myoma Nyein wrote for the occasion songs titled "Olympics" and "Yin Dago Me" (Beauty Contest). His song for the 1947 Burmese New Year Thingyan "Shwe Man Taung Yeikkho" a.k.a. "Mya Nandar" (In the Shade of Mandalay Hill) has become a perennial classic during the festive season. In 1952 he wrote "Lu Chun Lu Gaung" (Good and Able) in honour of Prime Minister U Nu's Pyidawtha (Welfare state) Conference in Rangoon. The following year he composed "Gaba Nyeinchan Yay" (World Peace). He started collaborating with Mandalay Motion Picture Company the next year.

== Family ==
In 1928 Myoma Nyein married Than May, a school teacher from Meiktila. His oldest daughter Tin Kyi was married to the artist Paw Oo Thet. His oldest son Shoon Myaing has carried on with the band which celebrated its 80th anniversary in 2005.

== Death ==
Nyein committed suicide in 1955, aged 46, by walking in front of a lorry driver.

== Discography ==
- Thet Wai
- Natshinnaung
- Sagaing Hill
- Hna Yaut Tae Nay Shin Tae
- Yae Cho Seik
- Soe Naunt Byar Bwae
- Ka Thit Pann
- Tain Lwar Mohh Mo Lwin
- Lu Chun Lu Kaung
- Turiyar Luu Lin
- Eain Taw Yar Pha Yar Zay
- Myin Khin Taw
- Nann Myo Taw
- Mae Zar Shwe Li/ Lat We Thon Da Ya
- Pyo Mhar Tann
- Parami Taw
- Sar So Khan La Lone
- Hla Myint Zu
- Man Dar Li
- Mae Dar Wi
- Thissa
- Eain Thu Pe Pe
- Binjo
- A Hla Pyaing Pwe
- Ko Duu Ko Chun
