= Man Taung Yeik Kho =

1947 song composed by Myoma Nyein

Single by Ant Gyi
- Language: Burmese
- English title: The Rest Under the Shade of Mandalay Hill
- Released: 1947
- Composer(s): Myoma Nyein

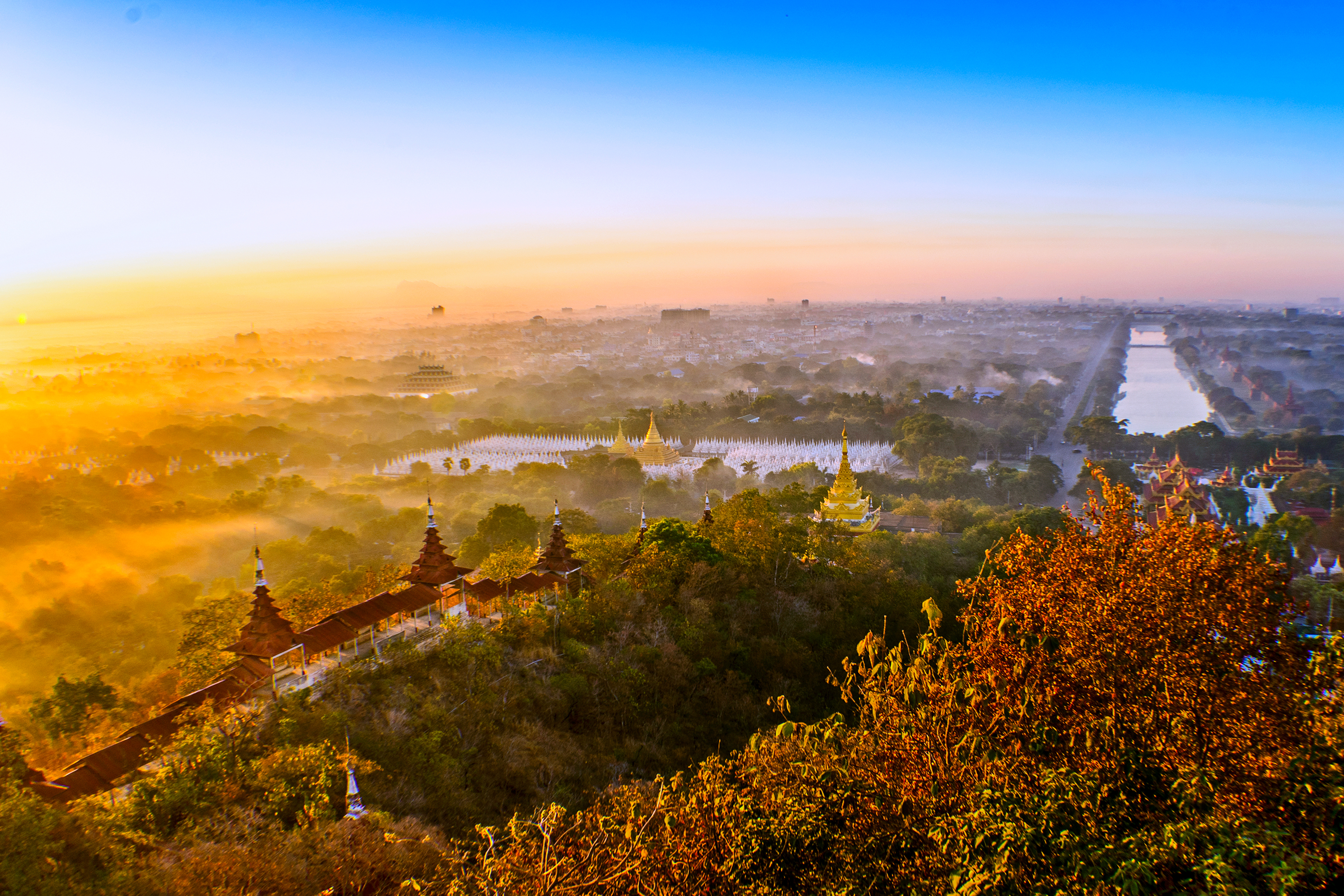
The Shade of Mandalay Hill

"Man Taung Yeik Kho" (Burmese: မန်းတောင်ရိပ်ခို, lit. 'The Rest Under the Shade of Mandalay Hill'), is a Burmese cultural song composed in 1947 by Burmese musician Myoma Nyein, one of the greatest musicians in Burmese classical music. The song contains a description of Thingyan sense on Mandalay Hill and Nandar Lake. The song was selected as one of the greatest Thingyan theme songs of all time.

Since "Man Taung Yeik Kho" song was a national legacy song of Thingyan festival, as the saying goes, "Thingyan will not be complete without Man Taung Yeik Kho ".

== History ==
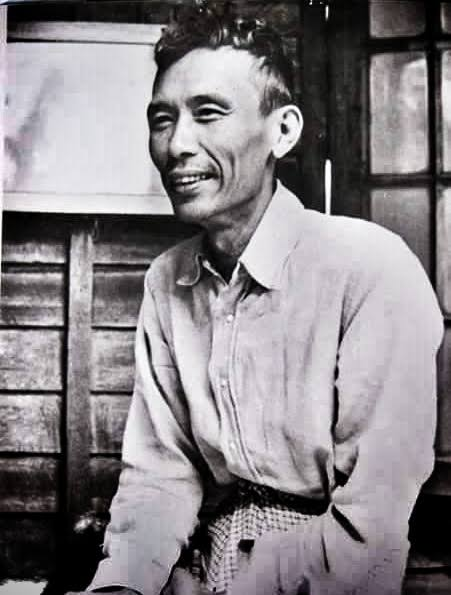
Myoma Nyein

"Man Taung Yeik Kho" was composed by Myoma Nyein in 1947, but in 2001 it was rumored that the song was co-written by Ba Thein and A One Sayar Nya together with Myoma Nyein. They selected one verse from each of their three songs and created as a medley song. However, the 1975 issue of Myoma Shwe Yatu Magazine, stated that the song was a work of Myoma Nyein. The first original singer of the song was Ant Gyi, background played by the BT Brothers Instrument Band, and was first broadcast on the Burma Radio in 1950.

== Lyrics ==
One of verses from the song. It is said to be composed by Myoma Nyein:

Burmese script

(မြနန္ဒာ ရေညိုညို ရစ်ခါသမ်းတယ်
ရွှေမန်း တောင်ရိပ်
အတူတူခိုသူ ပျိုဖြူတွေရယ်)²
ပျော်ခင်းလေး သာပါ ဘိတယ်
နိမိတ်ကောင်း ယူမယ်
နှစ်ဦး သင်္ကြန်တော်ဝယ်

English translation

(translation needed)
