= Myoma Amateur Music Association =

Burmese music band established in 1925

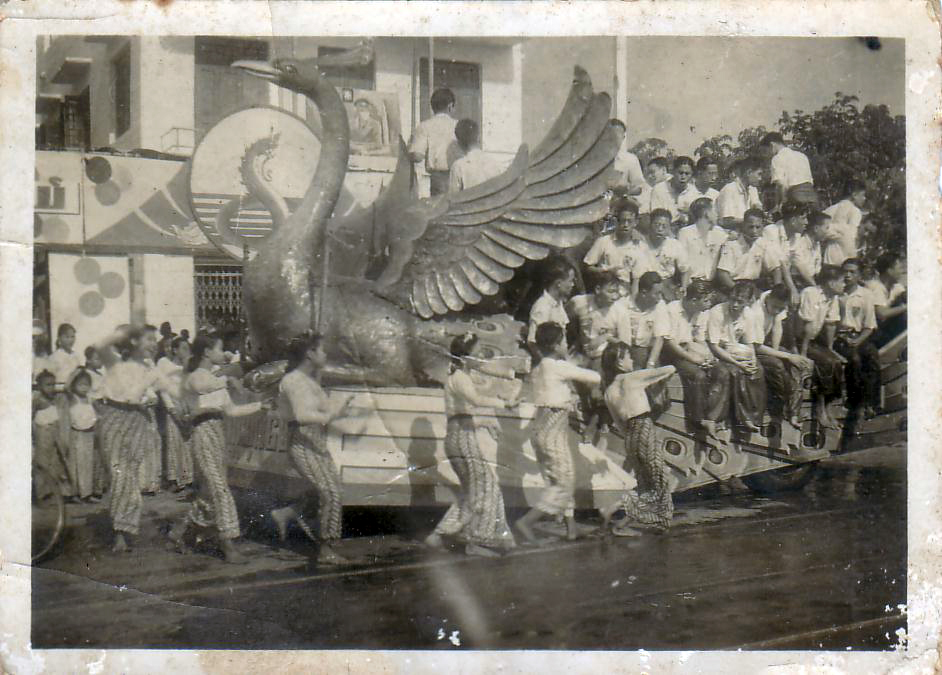
- The Myoma troupe in 1958

Background information
- Also known as: Myoma band Myoma troupe
- Origin: Mandalay, British Burma (now Myanmar)
- Genres: Traditional Burmese music
- Years active: 1925–present
- Past members: Myoma Nyein, Gyi Ohn, Gyi Ngwe, Thant, Hla Din, and Mya Thein

The Myoma Amateur Music Association (Burmese: မြို့မတူရိယာအသင်း), commonly known as the Myoma troupe or Myoma band, is a traditional Burmese music band. Established in 1925 in Mandalay, it is the longest surviving band in the country.

== History ==
Myoma was established in 1925 by amateur musicians - Myoma Nyein, Gyi Ohn, Gyi Ngwe, Thant, Hla Din, and Mya Thein - in Mandalay, British Burma (now Myanmar). In 1928, a Chinese pawn shop owner donated money, enabling the band to expand its repertoire to a variety of wind instruments. The band's composer and leader, Myoma Nyein, became one of the country's most distinguished musicians. Throughout the years, the band briefly changed its name to others such as Naypyidaw, but ultimately reverted to its original name, Myoma.

From 1927 until 1978, Myoma was a fixture in Mandalay's Thingyan (traditional new year) celebrations, parading the city and performing live atop a parade float featuring a silver swan. The tradition was resumed in 1996. Over the years, notable actors and singers like Win Oo performed with Myoma. The band also entertained foreign delegations, including Zhou Enlai and Chen Yi, who visited Burma in the 1960s.
