= Sandamuni Pagoda =

Buddhist Pagoda in Mandalay, Myanmar

- စန္ဒာမုနိစေတီ
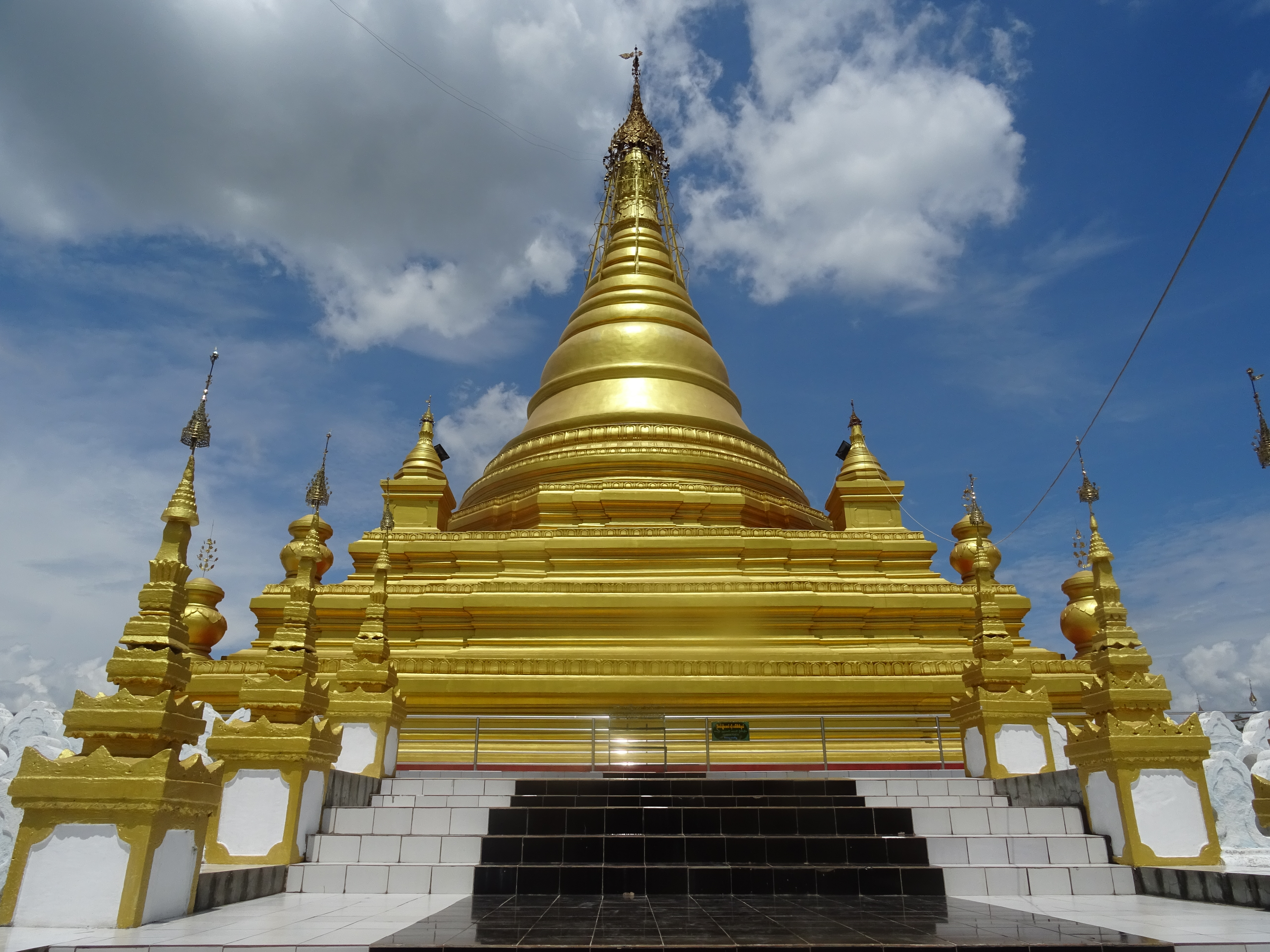

- Location in Myanmar

Religion
- Affiliation: Theravada Buddhism

Location
- Country: Mandalay, Mandalay Region, Burma
- Coordinates: 22.003470°N 96.109758°E

Architecture
- Founder: King Mindon Min
- Completed: 1874; 152 years ago

Sandamani Pagoda (Burmese: စန္ဒာမုနိစေတီ; formally နန်းမြေဘုံသာစံနန်းတော်ရာစန္ဒာမုနိဘုရား) is a Buddhist stupa located southwest of Mandalay Hill. It was commissioned by King Mindon Min in 1874 as a memorial to his younger brother, Kanaung Mintha, who was assassinated along with 3 princes, Malun, Saku, and Maingpyin, during the 1866 Myingun Prince rebellion. The pagoda was erected at the provisional location of the royal palace, the Nanmyay Bontha.

This pagoda contains the graves of the Kanaung, Sagu Mintha, Malun and Maingpyin Princes. It also contains an iron image of the Buddha cast by Bodawpaya in 1802, and removed from Amarapura by Mindon in 1874. The statue reportedly weighs 40,924.8 pounds (18,563.2 kg).

== Gallery ==
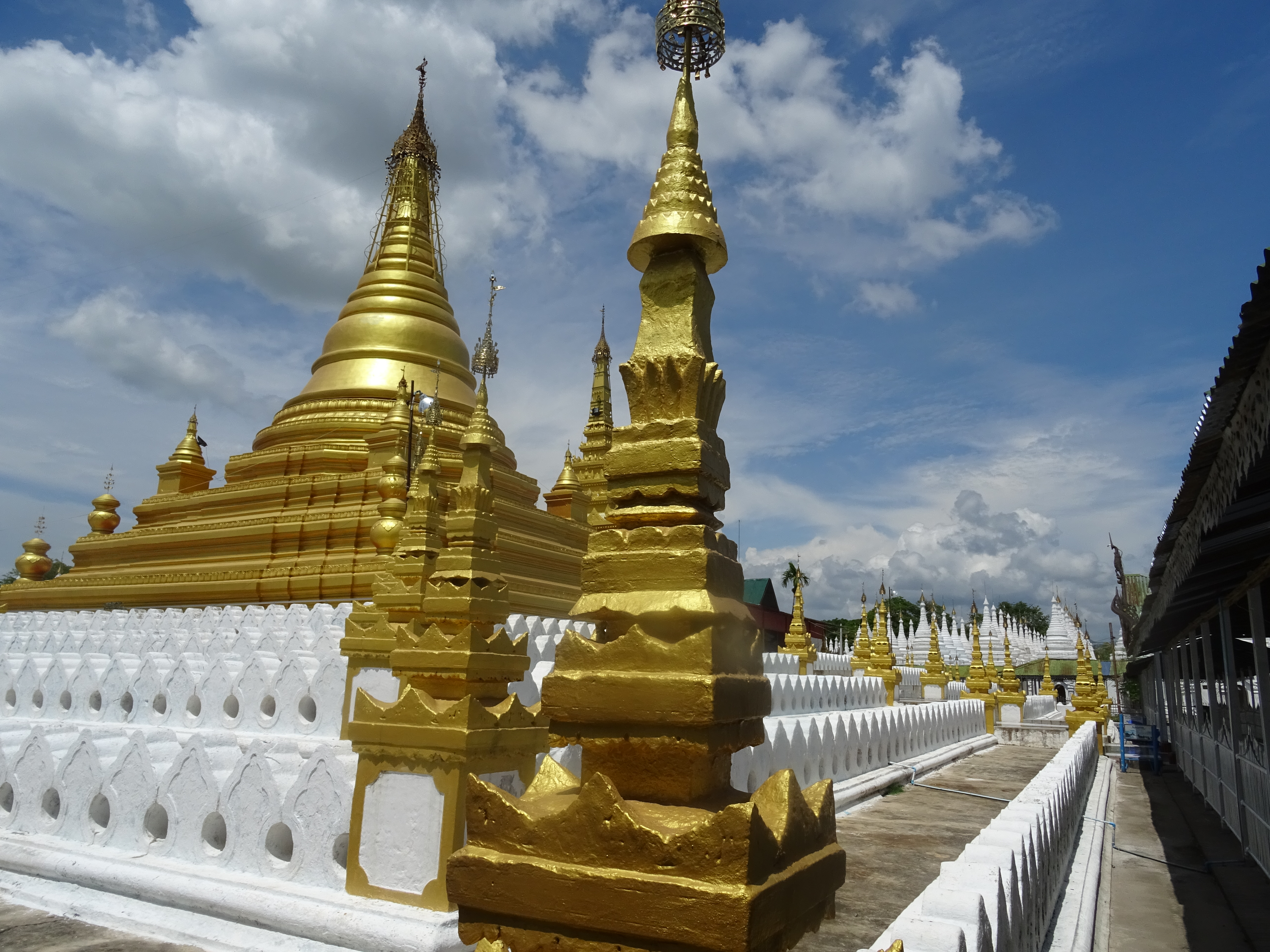

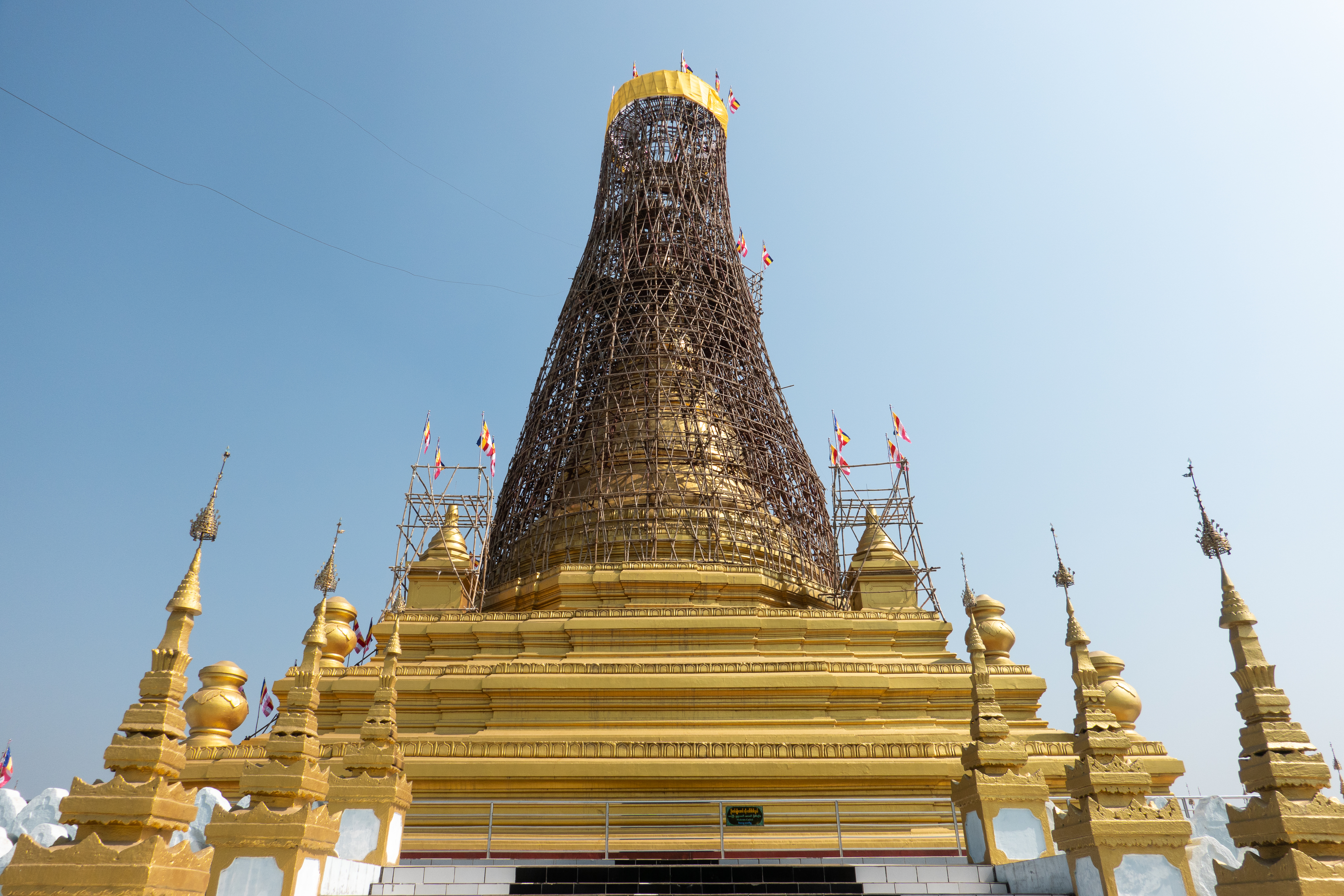
(under repair)

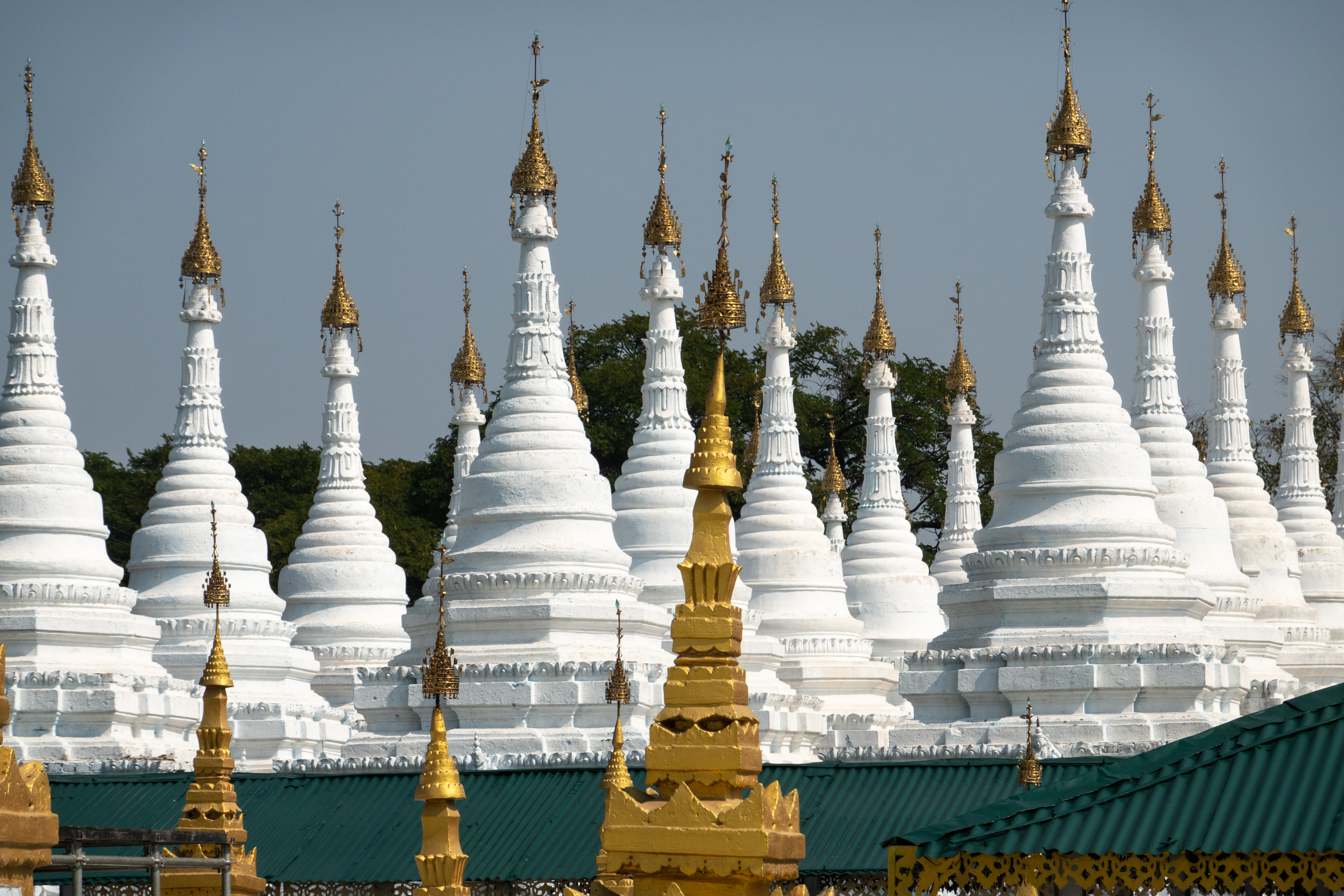

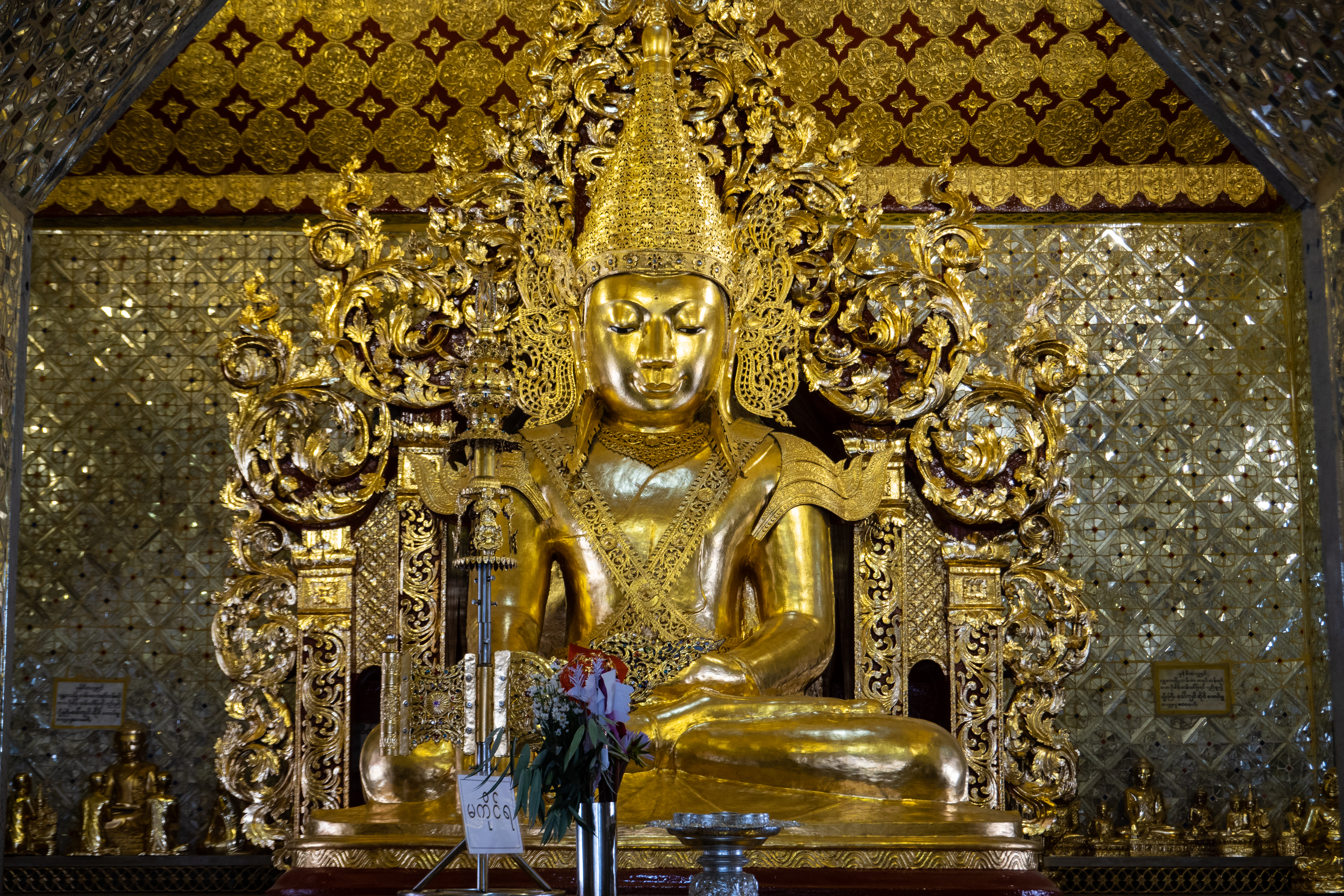

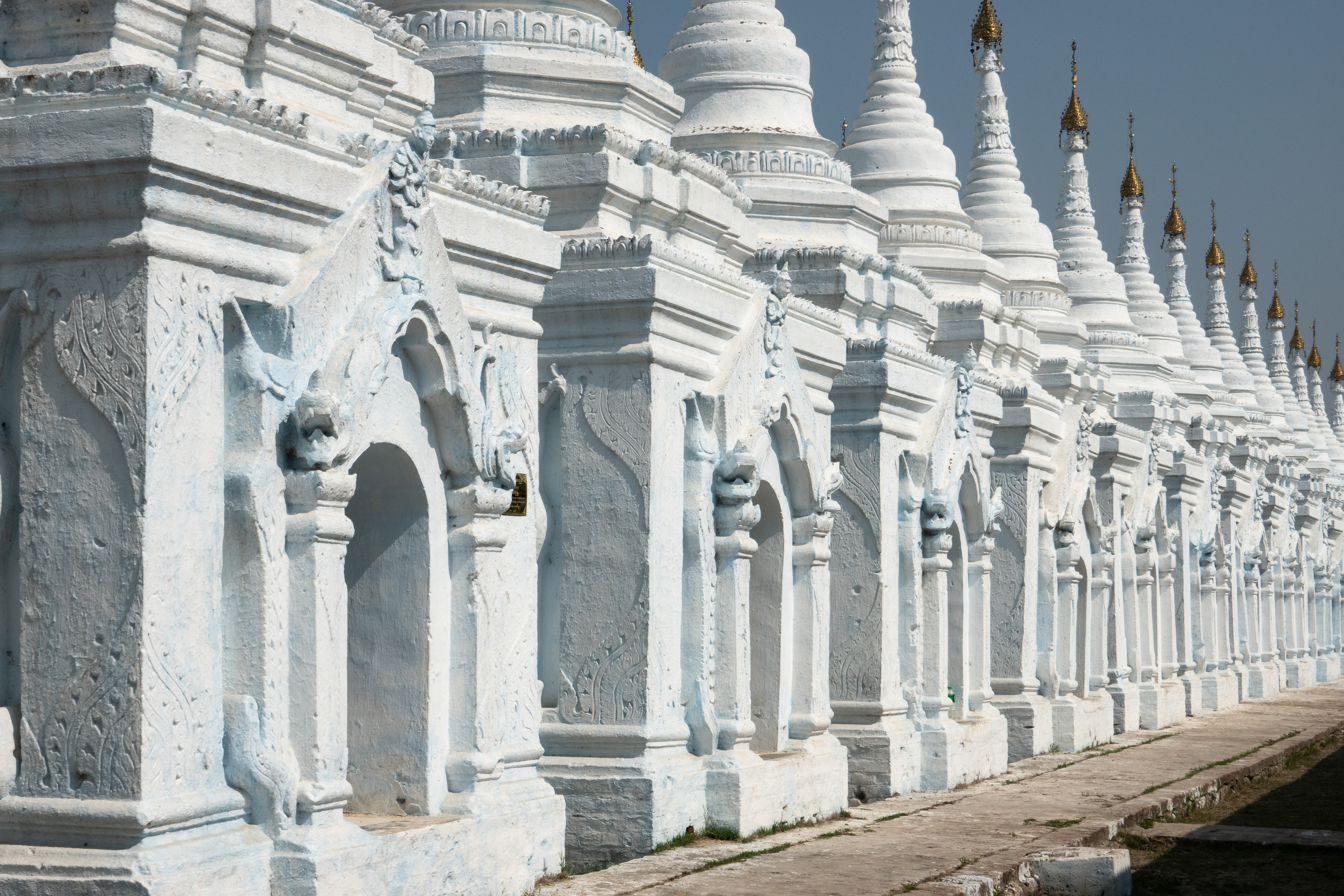

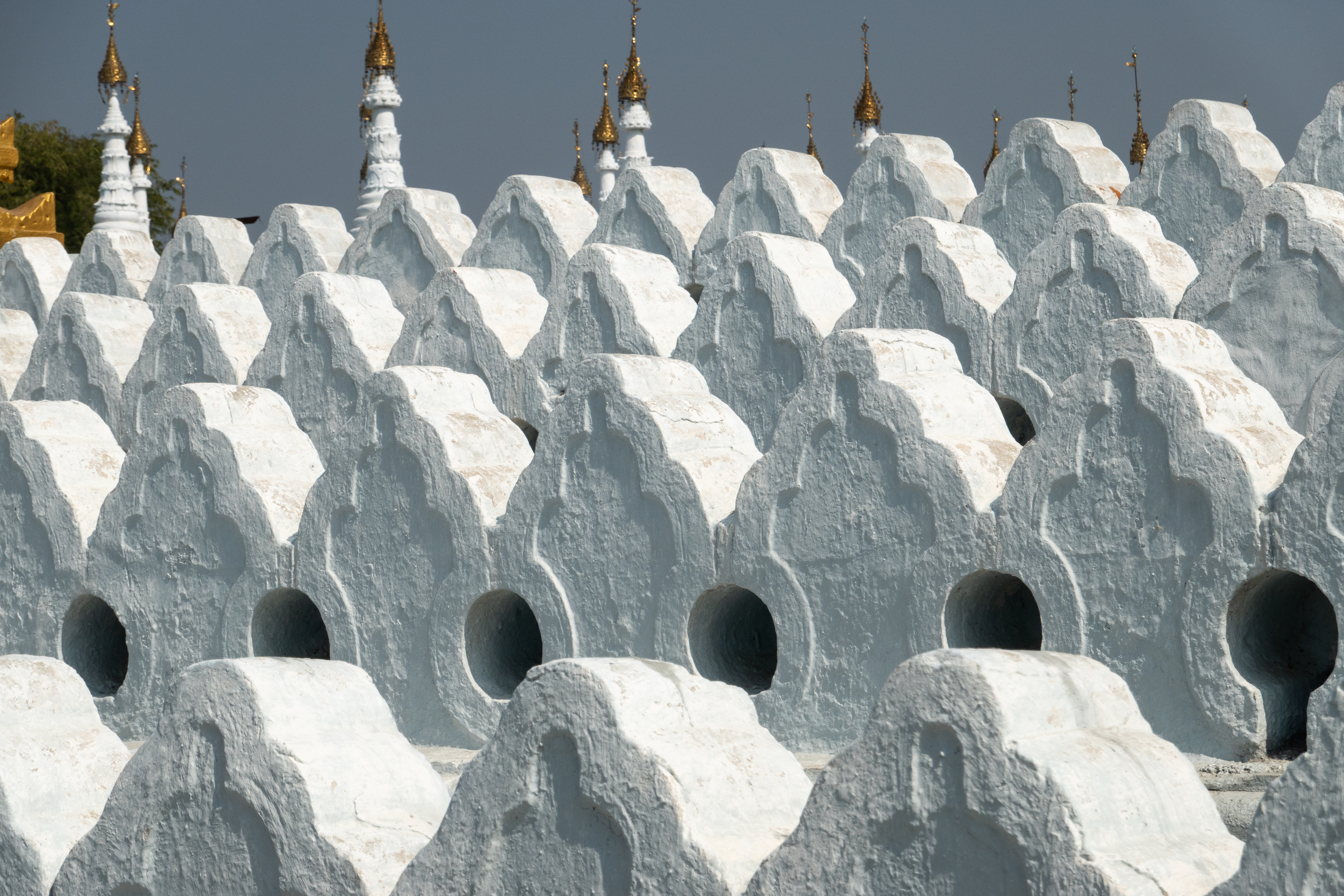

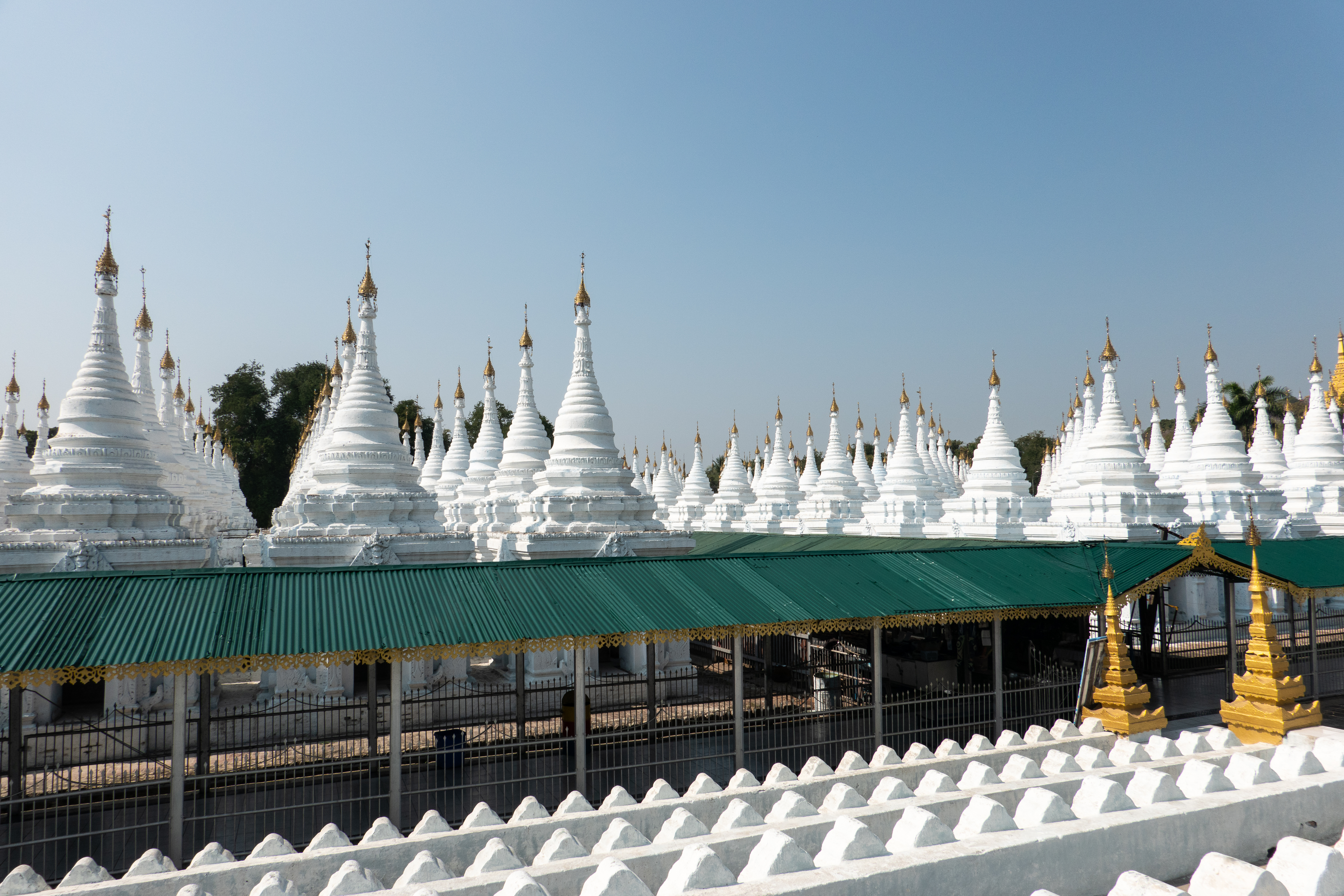
