= Ant Gyi =

Ant Gyi အံ့ကြီး
- Born: 17 June 1923; Maymyo, British Burma
- Died: 23 June 2017 (aged 94) Yangon, Myanmar
- Occupation: Musician

Ant Gyi (Burmese: အံ့ကြီး 17 June 1923 – 23 June 2017) was a prominent Burmese singer and musician, best known for singing classic Burmese songs including "Man Taung Yeik Kho" (မန်းတောင်ရိပ်ခို/မြနန္ဒာ), "Lu Gyun Lu Kaung" (လူချွန်လူကောင်း), "Yin Ta Ko Me" (ယဉ်တစ်ကိုယ်မယ်), "Babu Thuza" (ပန်းပုသူဇာ), "Turiya Lulin" တူရိယာလုလင်, "Yangon Thu" (ရန်ကုန်သူ), "Turiya Lon May" (တူရိယာလုံမေ), "Aung Pinle" အောင်ပင်လယ်, and "Shwe Mingan" (ရွှေမင်းဂံ).

== Personal life ==
Ant Gyi was born on 17 June 1923 in Maymyo (now Pyin Oo Lwin), to K.K. Bhattacharjee, Superintendent of the Forest Department (Chindwin Circle), and Daw Win. He studied at American Baptist Mission School and Government Anglo-Vernacular High School.

In 1949, he formed an amateur musical troup, called the B.T. Bros in Rangoon (now Yangon), and broadcast songs in Burmese, Japanese, and Indonesian languages from the Burma Broadcasting Station, Radio Republik Indonesia, Radio Japan and All India Radio, and televised personal shows from NHK television network (1953) and from NTV (1961). He also performed for various foreign delegations including, Indonesia in 1950 and China in September 1960. Ant Gyi was a member of the Young Men's Buddhist Association, Burma Journalist Association, and the Union of Burma Musical Arts and Research Society.

Married to Daw May Nyunt, Ant Gyi had two sons and one daughter. He died on 23 June 2017 at the Parami General Hospital in Yangon, Myanmar, and cremated at Yayway Cemetery on 25 June. His grand-nephew, Htun Htun, is an actor.
