= Mandalay Hill =

Major Buddhist pilgrimage site in Mandalay, Myanmar

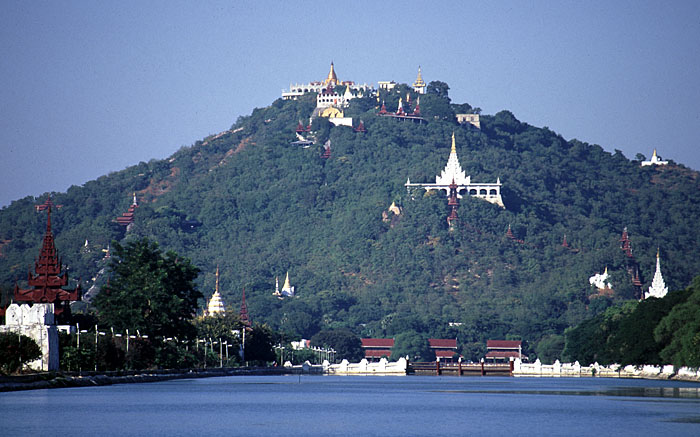

Highest point
- Elevation: 224 m (735 ft)
- Listing: List of mountains in Burma
- Coordinates: 22°0′51″N 96°6′27″E

Naming
- Native name: မန္တလေးတောင် (Burmese)

Geography
- Location within Myanmar
- Location: Aungmyethazan Township, Mandalay, Myanmar

Climbing
- First ascent: unknown
- Easiest route: escalator

Mandalay Hill (Burmese: မန္တလေးတောင်, MLCTS: manta. le: taung [màɰ̃dəlé tàʊɰ̃]) is a hill with an elevation of 240 m (790 ft) to the northeast of the city centre of Mandalay in Myanmar. The city took its name from the hill. Mandalay Hill is known for its abundance of pagodas and monasteries, and has been a major pilgrimage site for Bamar Buddhists for nearly two centuries. At the top of the hill is the Sutaungpyei (literally wish-fulfilling) Pagoda. A panoramic view of Mandalay from the top of Mandalay Hill alone makes it worthwhile to attempt a climb up its stairways. There are four covered stairways called saungdan leading up the hill from the south, southeast, west and north, and convenient seats of masonry work line these stairways all the way up. A one-way motor road today saves time and also makes it accessible for those who are unable to climb up the stairs, leading to an escalator and a lift to the pagoda at the summit.

== Climbing Mandalay Hill ==
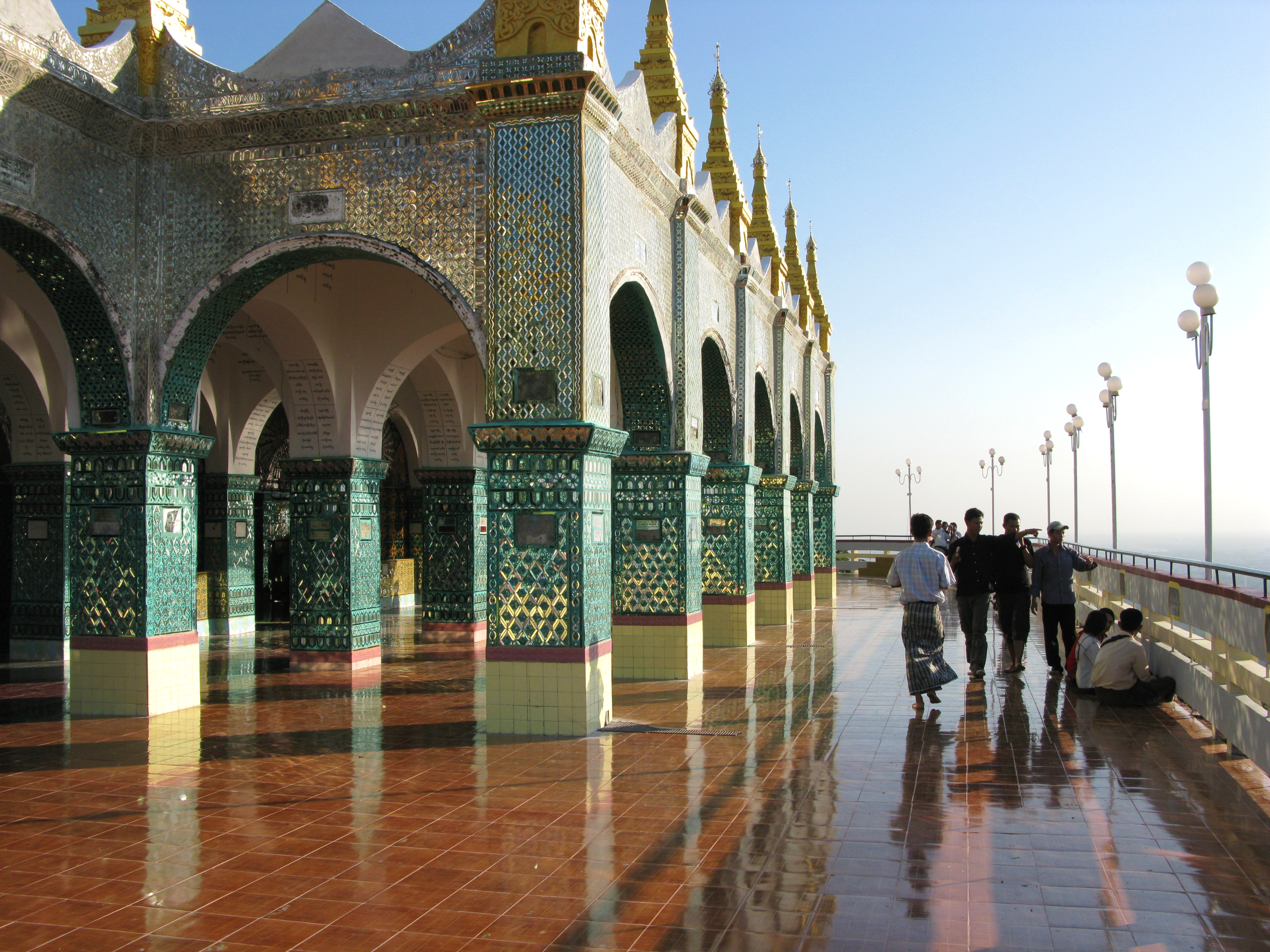
Sutaungpyai Temple, decorative mosaics

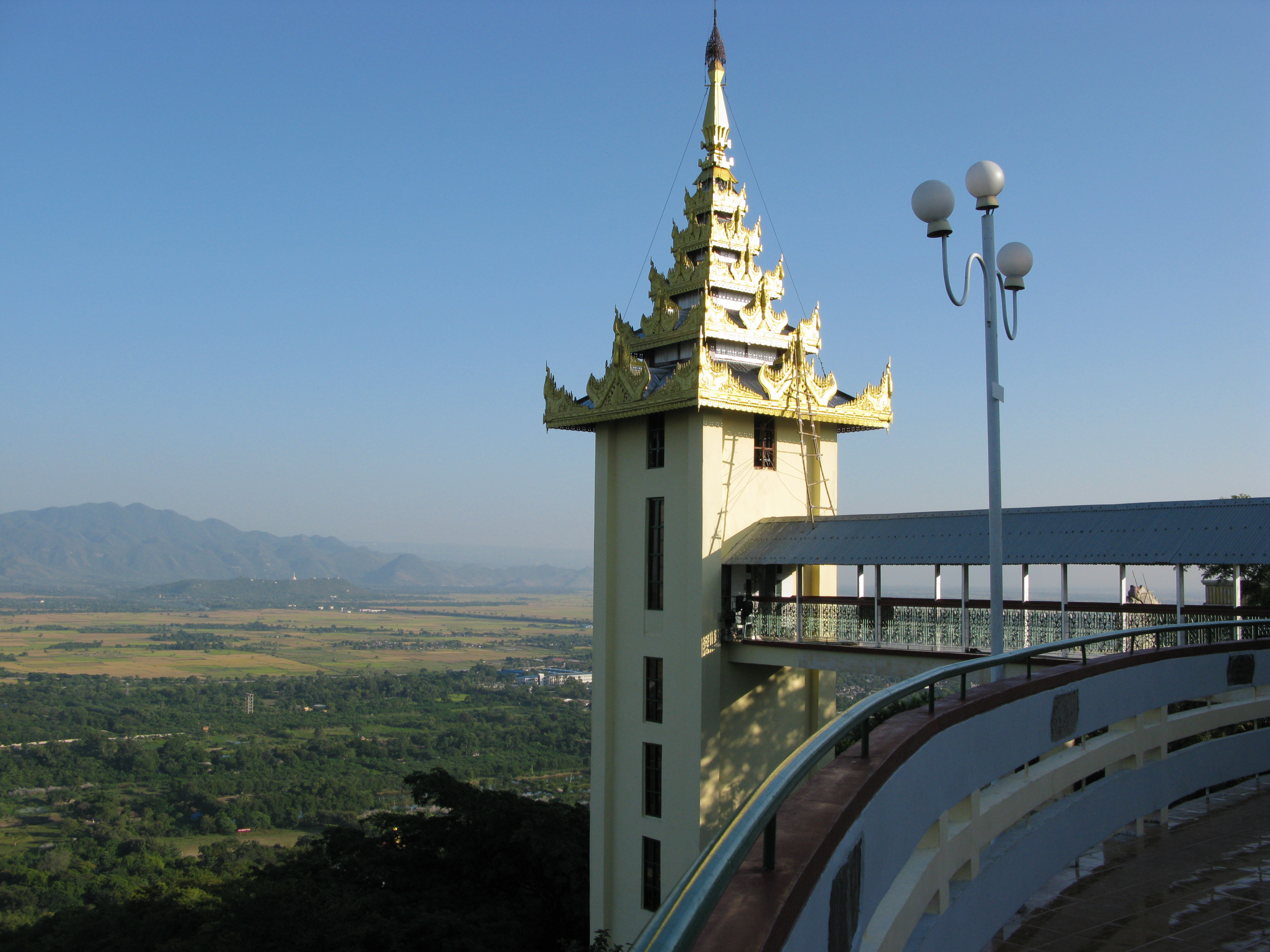
View from the Sutaungpyai terrace

Buddhists consider climbing the hill a rewarding experience and a meritorious deed for those able to do so. Two statues of chinthes or leogryphs (stylised lion figures) stand guard at the southern and main approach at the foot of the hill, popularly known as the Chinthe hnakaung atet (Burmese: ခြင်္သေ့နှစ်ကောင်အတက်, lit. 'two chinthes ascent'). It is a gentle climb and there are many stops along the way, most importantly the hermit U Khanti's dazaung or hall where the Peshawar Relics ( three fragments of bone of the Gautama Buddha) were kept from 1923 until after the Second World War when they were moved to a building at the foot of the hill and no longer on display. Leaving U Khanti's dazaung is by way of a tunnel lined by Hnakyeik shissu or the 28 Buddhas of the past and present worlds, or alternatively up a steep flight of steps next to the tunnel. Climbers will see plenty of stalls selling flowers, paper streamers, miniature pennants and umbrellas for the Buddha, and food and refreshment for visitors and pilgrims. All the dazaungs have frieze paintings, most of them from the late Konbaung dynasty period; there is one depicting 'Awizi ngayè (Avici Hell) in gory detail.

Farther up, halfway to the summit, a large standing image of the Buddha called the Shweyattaw (literally standing) or Byadeippay (prophesying) Buddha occupies the Shweyettaw Buddha Pavilion. The statue depicts the Buddha with his right hand pointing towards the city, a non-traditional mudra. Legend has it that the Buddha once visited the place and prophesied that in the year 2400 of the Buddhist Era a great city would be built at the foot of the hill where his teachings would flourish. One curiosity that belongs to the myth surrounding the ancient kingdom of Bagan is the so-called 'Kyanzittha's spear mark' near the top of the hill. According to legend, he executed a miraculous pole vault across the Irrawaddy using his spear .

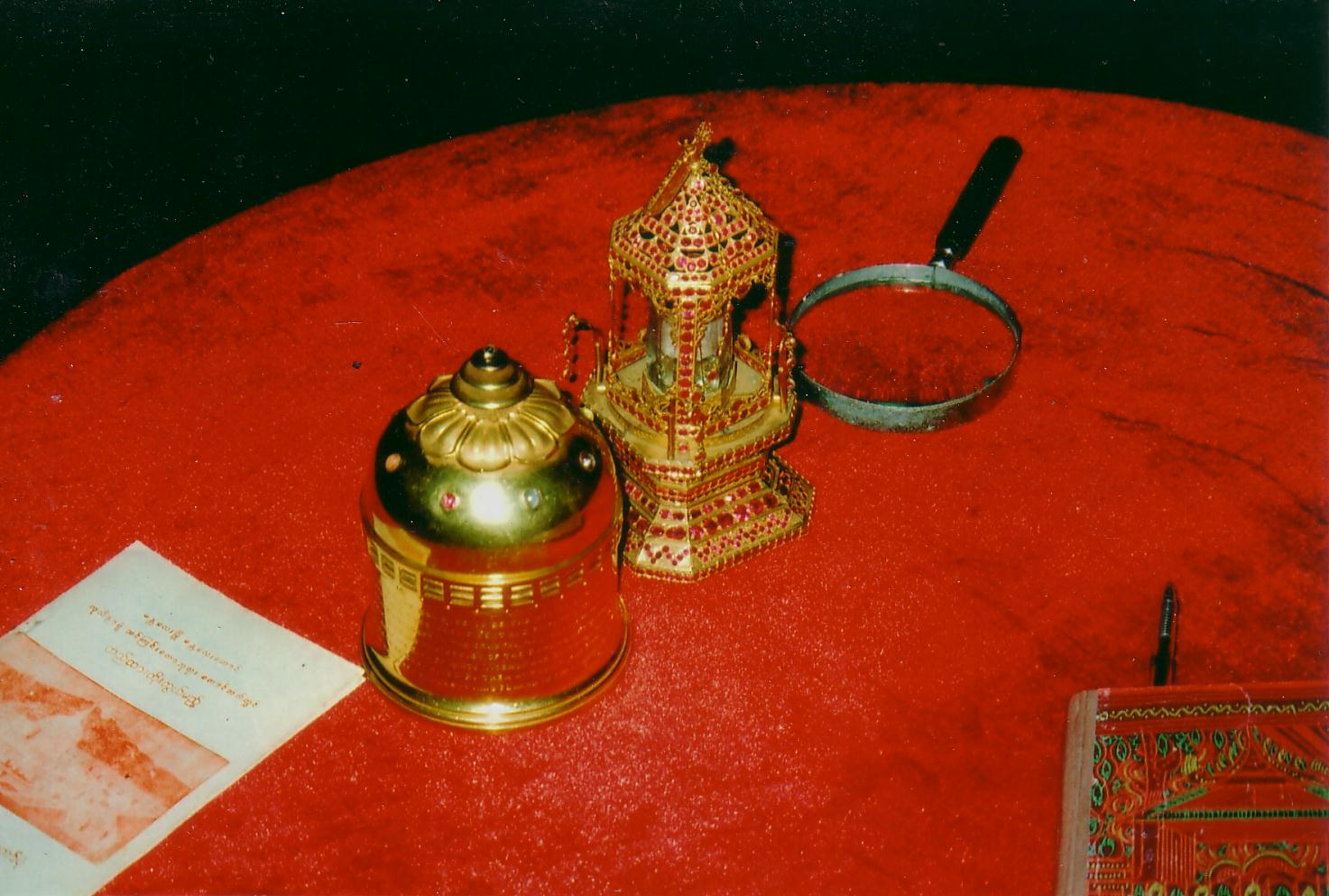
The Peshawar Relics are kept in the hermit U Khanti's dazaung (hall).

The last stop before the Sutaungpyei pagoda completes the legend of Mandalay. Here on the south terrace of a small stupa is the image of the ogress Sanda Muhki who, for want of something to offer the Buddha, made an offering of her own breasts. And for this extreme act of merit the Buddha made the prophecy that Sanda Muhki would be reborn as a great king who would build a city at the foot of the hill and become a great supporter of Buddhism in the year 2400 of the Buddhist Era (1857 AD), the year King Mindon laid the foundations of Mandalay. On each of the four corners of the terrace can be seen a king of the ogres with his army of miniature ogre images behind him paying obeisance to the Buddha. There are also images of various creatures, one at each level before a Buddha image, such as a rabbit, a cockerel or a lizard, representations of the Buddha's innumerable rebirths during his cycle of Samsara (birth, suffering, death and rebirth).

== At the summit ==
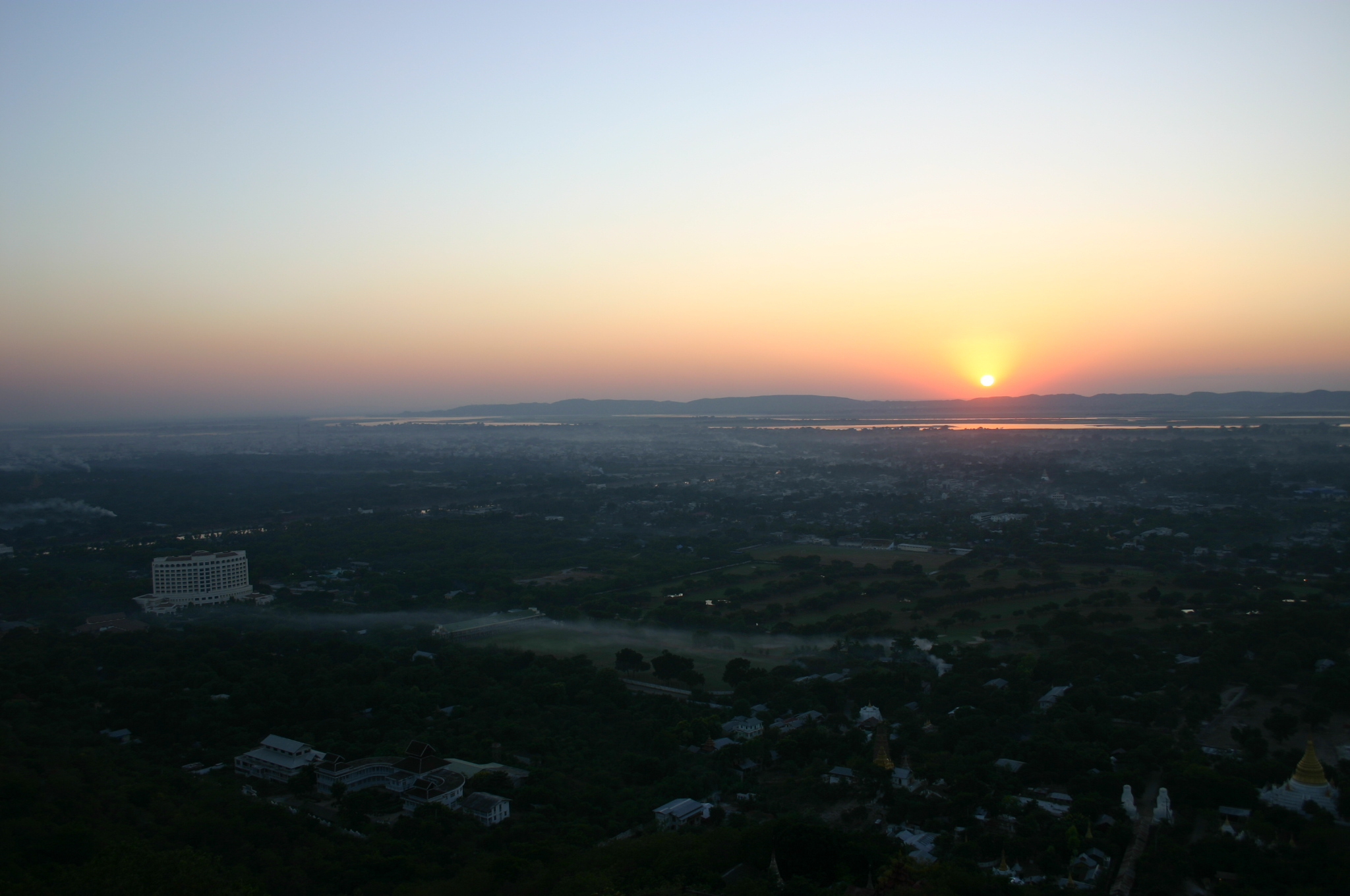
Sunset from Mandalay Hill

Once on the terrace of the Sutaungpyei Pagoda, a panoramic view of the Mandalay plain stretches far to the horizon, with the old city walls and moat, the Thudhamma Zayats (rest houses), various stupas around such as the Kuthodaw Pagoda and its 729 satellite stupas each housing a page inscribed in stone the world's largest book (the entire Pali Buddhist Canon), Kyauktawgyi Buddha Temple and Sandamuni Pagoda, the Irrawaddy to the west and the Minwun Hills on its opposite bank, the road to Madaya and Mogok to the north, and the Shan Yoma range of mountains to the east. There is yet a final stop down the northern slope immediately after the Sutaungpyei Pagoda called the Mwegyi hnakaung (Two Great Snakes) Pagoda. It has the images of two cobras that were believed to frequent the hill to pay their obeisance to the Buddha and above these images seated are those of two Nats that they became when they died. Pilgrims stuff bank notes in the cobras' mouths and pray. The Champac, with its fragrant white blossoms on branches like candelabra, grows wild on the hill, along with the crimson red flowers over the feathery foliage of the Flame tree.

== World War II ==
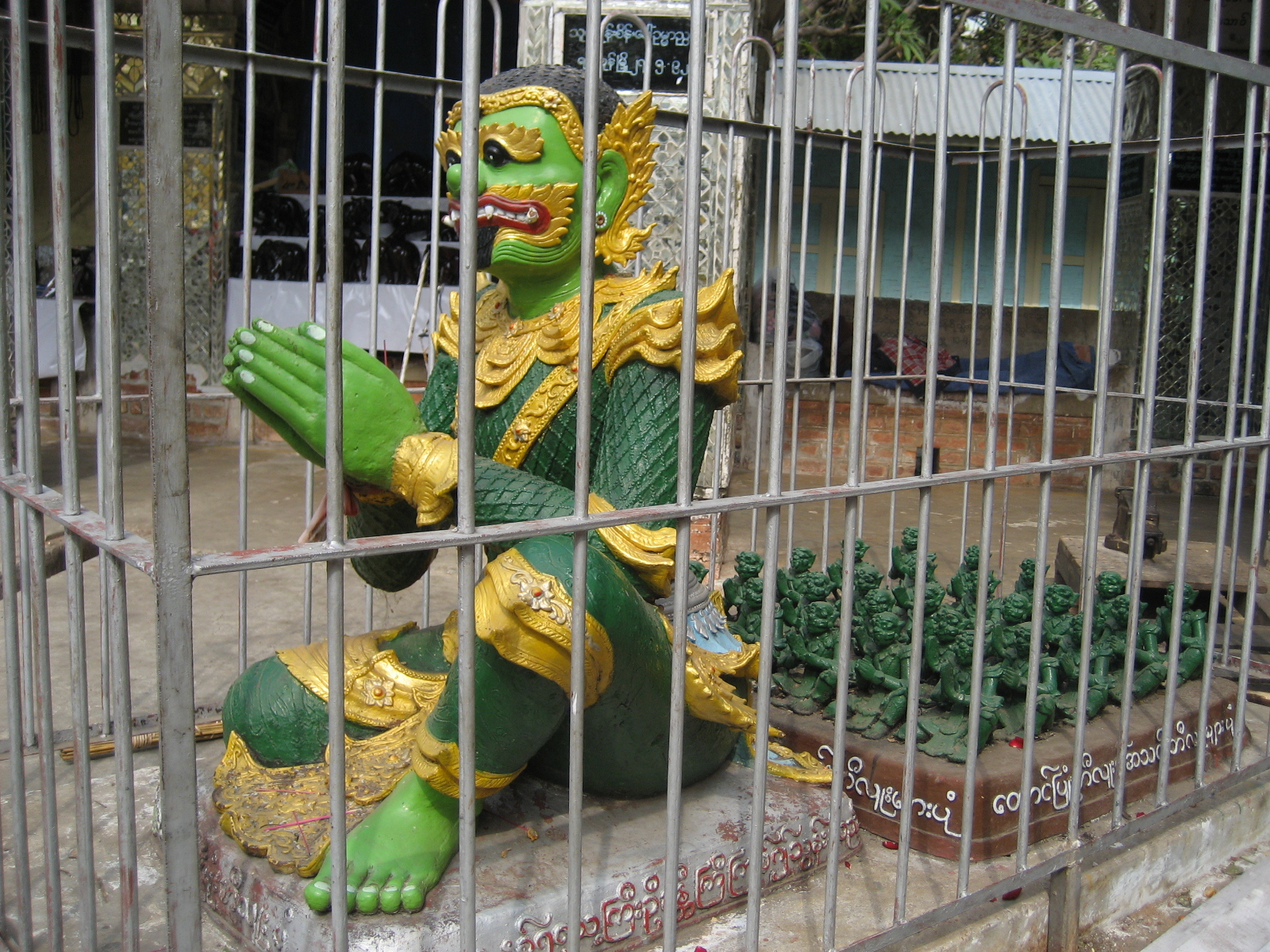
An ogre king and his army at the Sanda Muhki pagoda

In March 1945, the British Fourteenth Army's Indian 19th Infantry Division under the command of Major-General Thomas Wynford 'Pete' Rees, dubbed the 'Pocket Napoleon' by his men on account of his size and successful military career, was closing in on the Japanese in Mandalay where resistance was based mainly at Mandalay Hill with its pagodas and temples honeycombed for machine-guns, well supplied and heavily garrisoned. Fort Dufferin or the walled city with the royal palace was another pocket of resistance by the remaining Japanese troops. A Gurkha battalion stormed up the hill engaging in fierce hand-to-hand fighting all day and night on 9 March, and they were joined the next day by two companies of a British battalion.

The Japanese stood firm and the last defenders had to be blown out from the cellars by rolling down petrol drums and igniting them with tracer bullets. It was not until 11 March that the hill fell into British hands. Aerial bombardment was resorted to when shelling from the hill failed to breach the city wall and destroy the enemy, and Mandalay Palace, a national heritage of great importance, burnt down during the siege. Whether it was the shelling and bombing or the enemy that destroyed the splendid teak palace was never determined with any certainty.

== Gallery ==
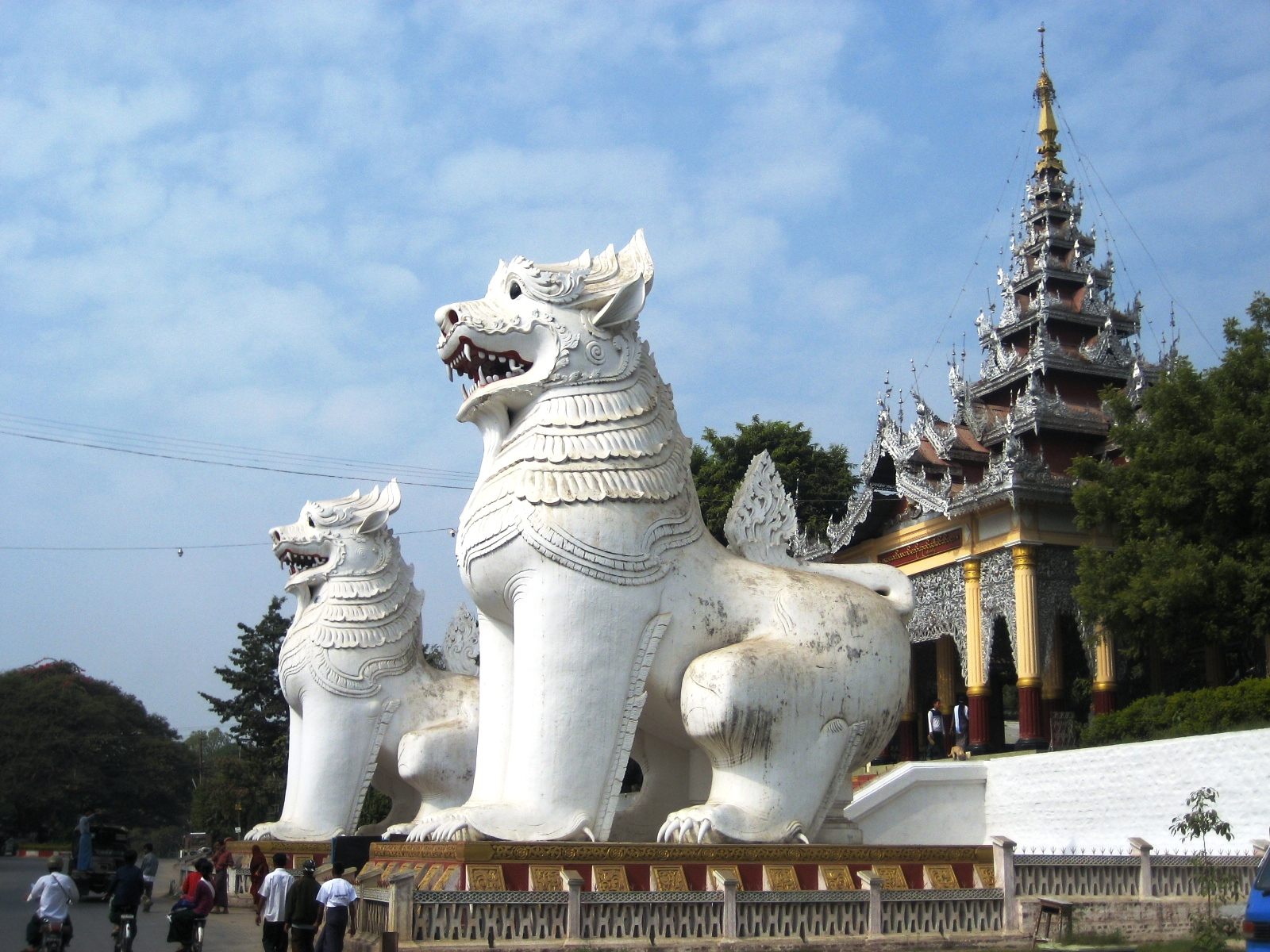
Two giant chinthes guard the southern approach to Mandalay Hill

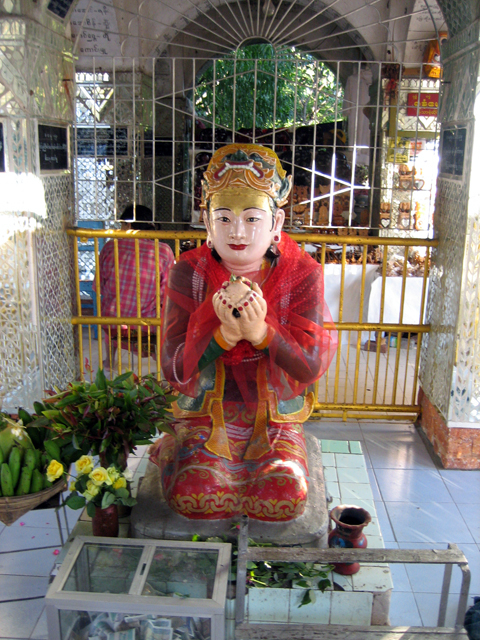
Sanda Muhki, the ogress, offering her own breasts to the Buddha

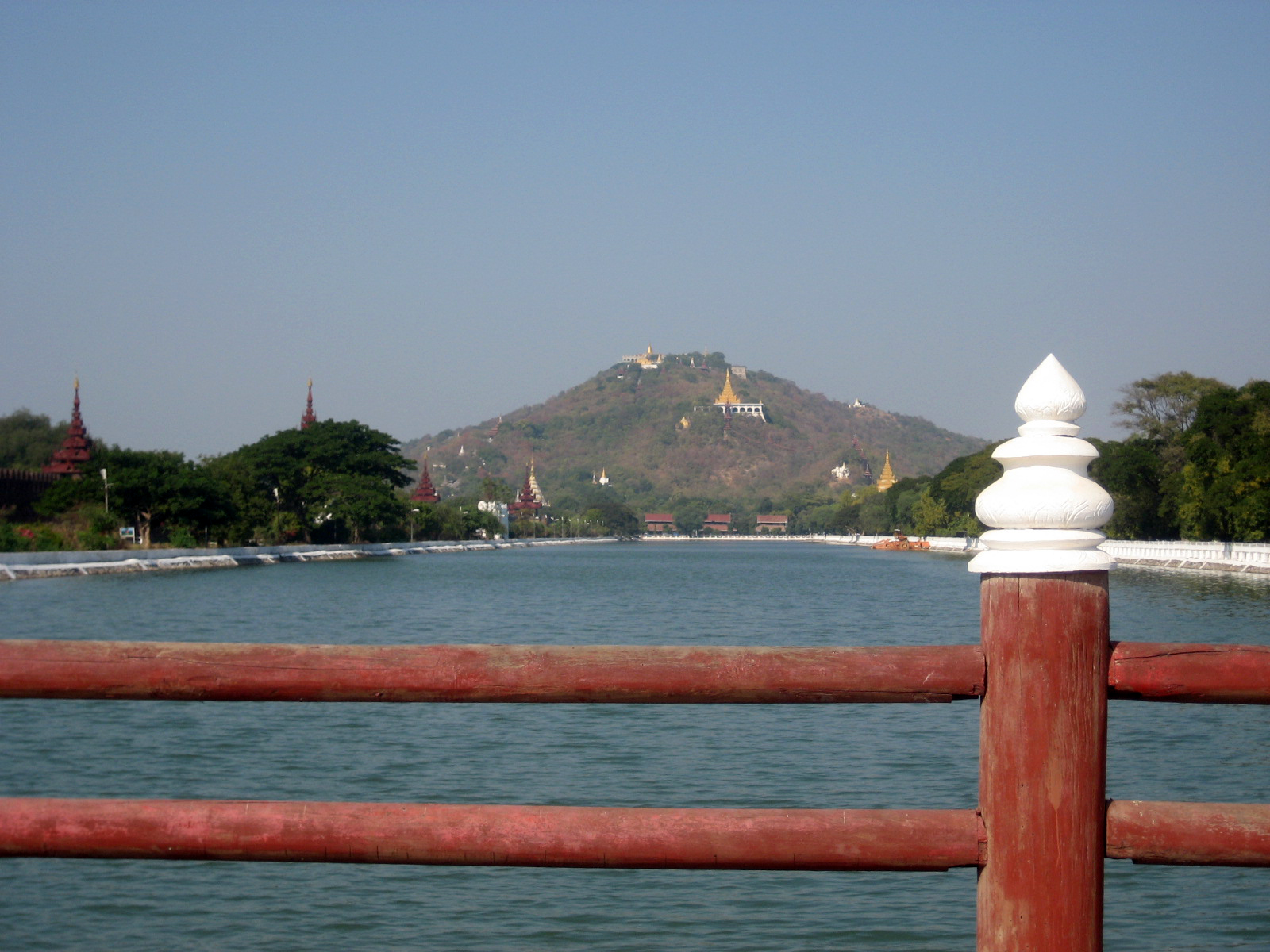
Mandalay Hill from East Moat Bridge

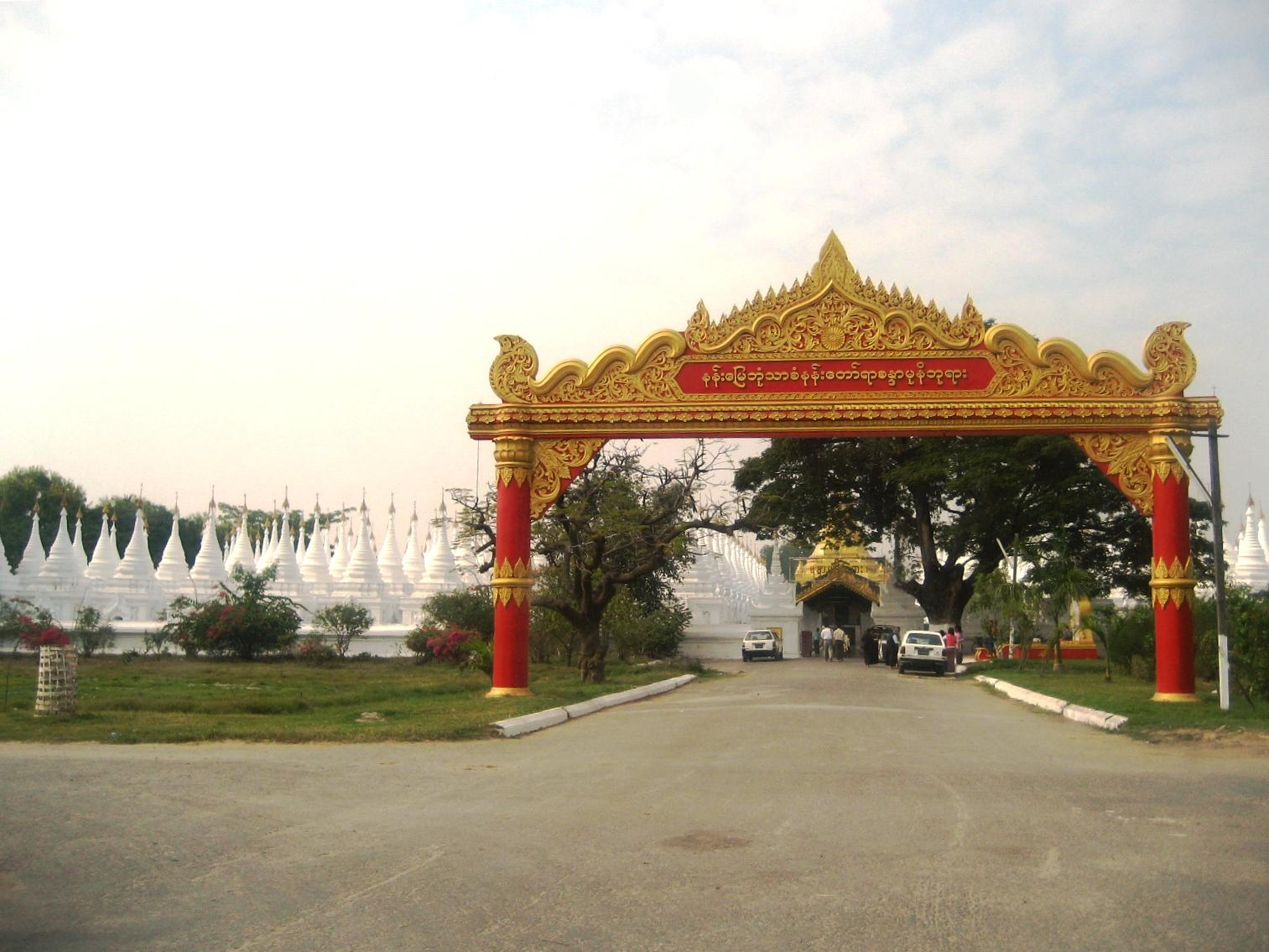
Sandamuni Pagoda where Crown Prince Ka Naung lies buried

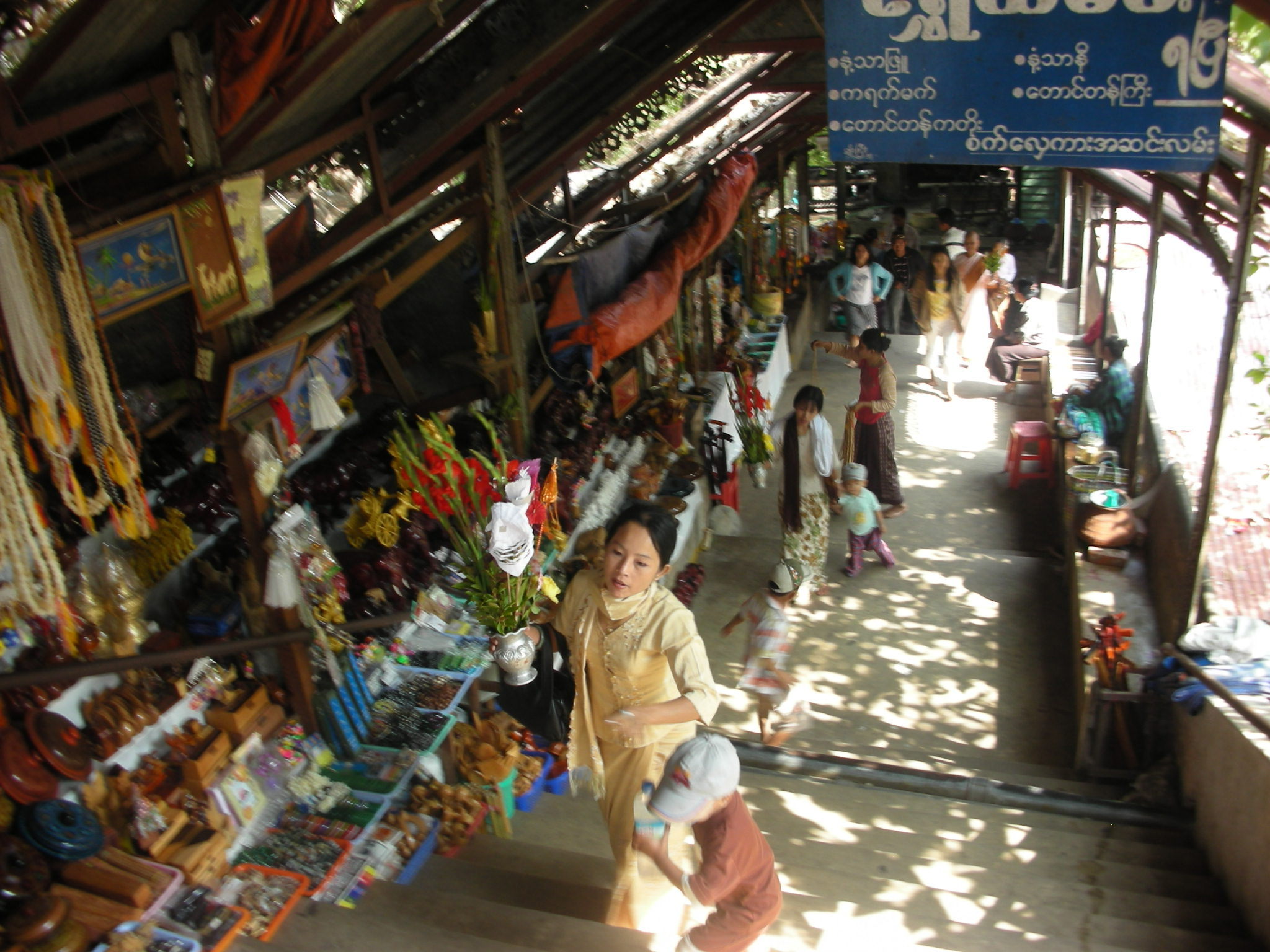
Up the saungdan at Mandalay Hill

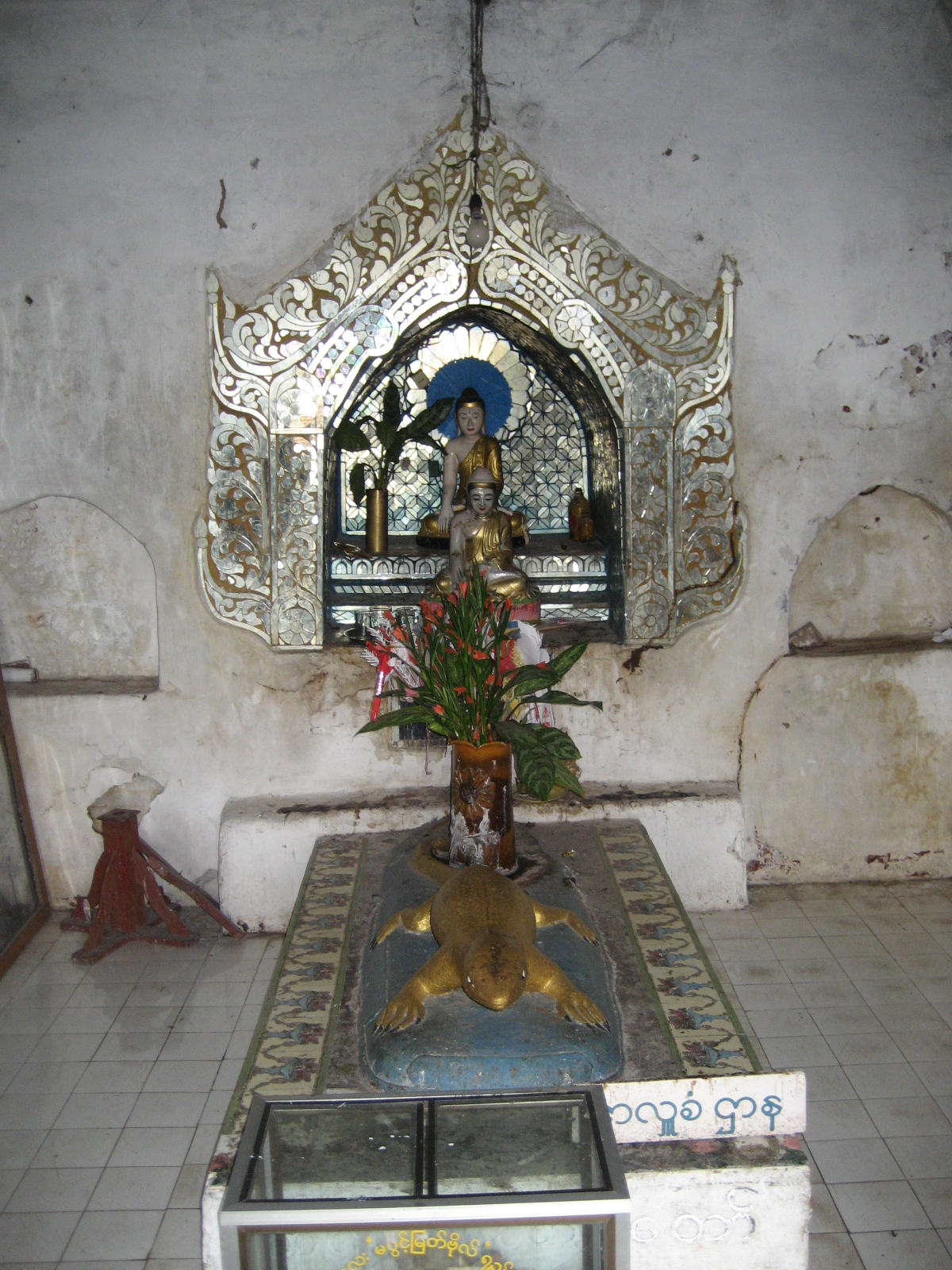
The lizard is one of many former incarnations of the Buddha

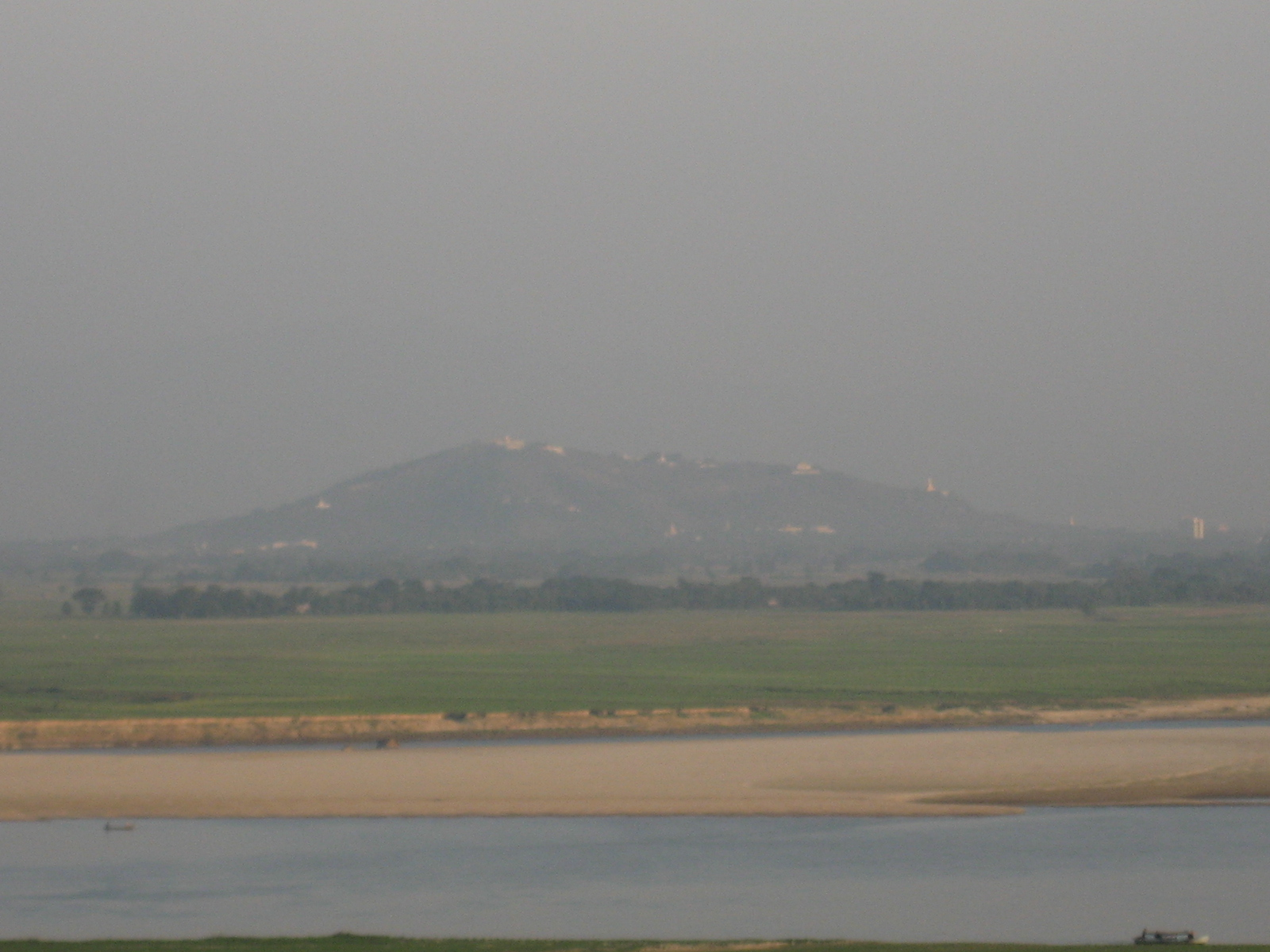
Mandalay Hill from Mingun across the Irrawaddy

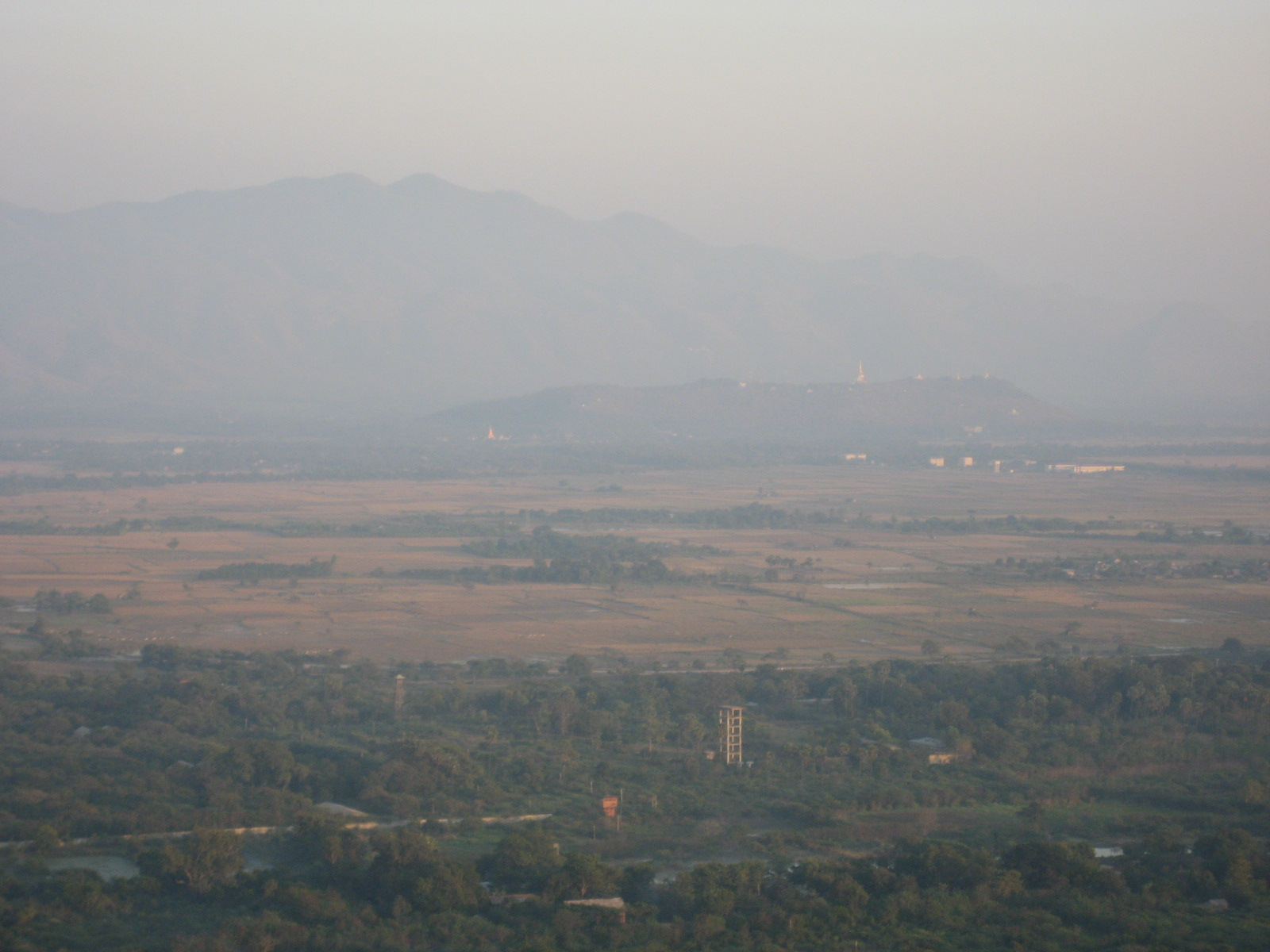
The Shan Yoma east of Mandalay Hill

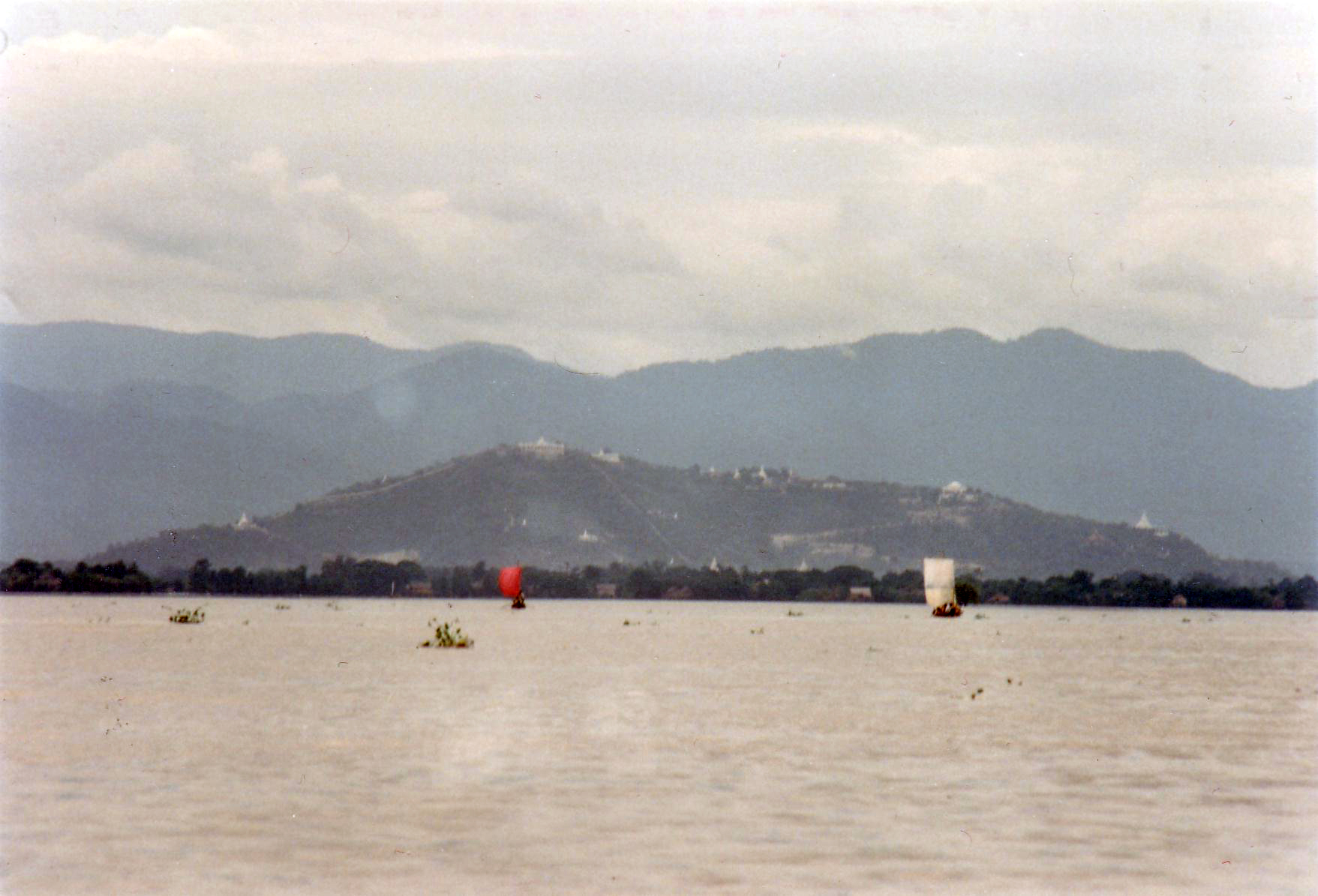
View from the west, on the River Irrawaddy

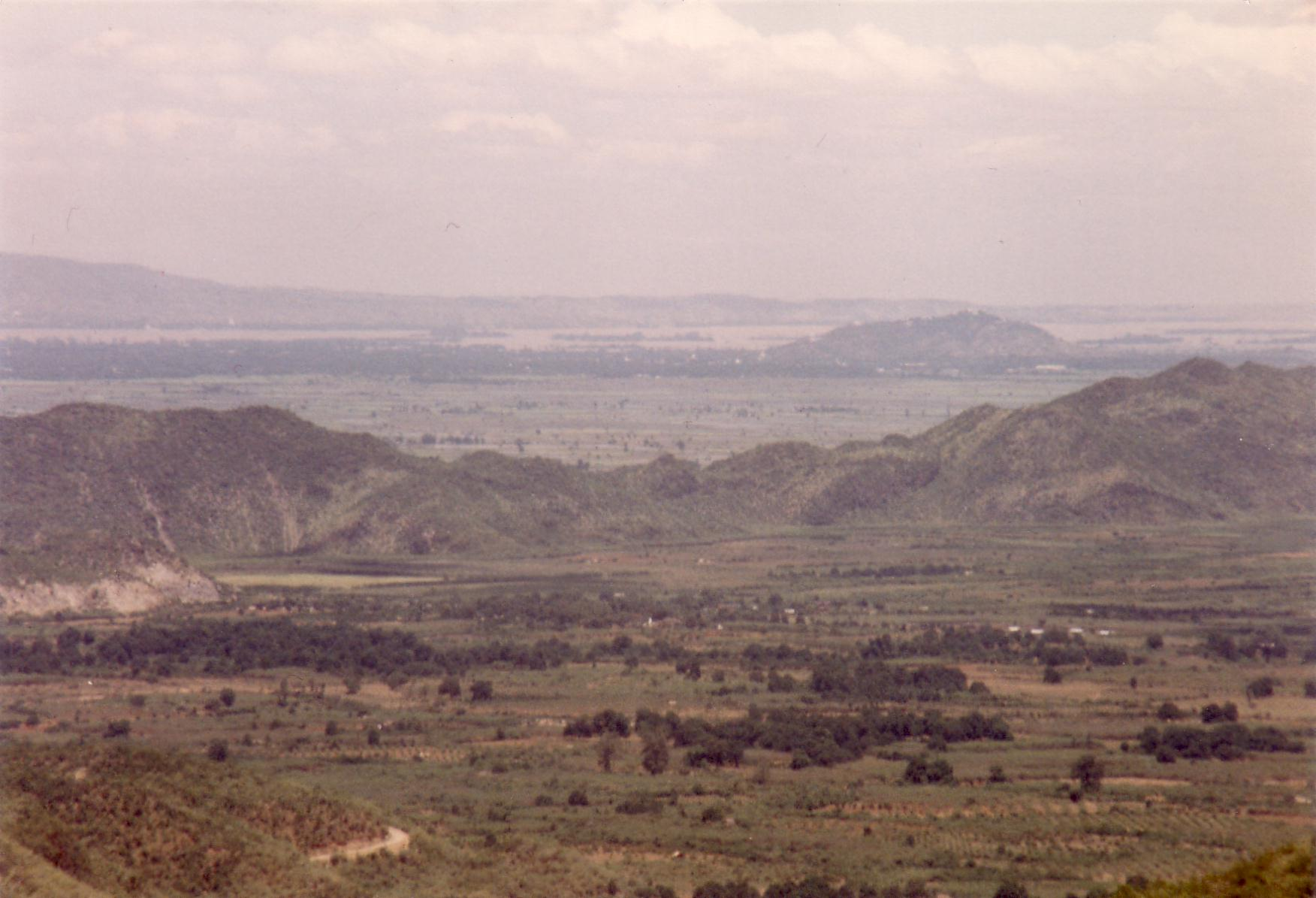
View from the east, Maymyo Road

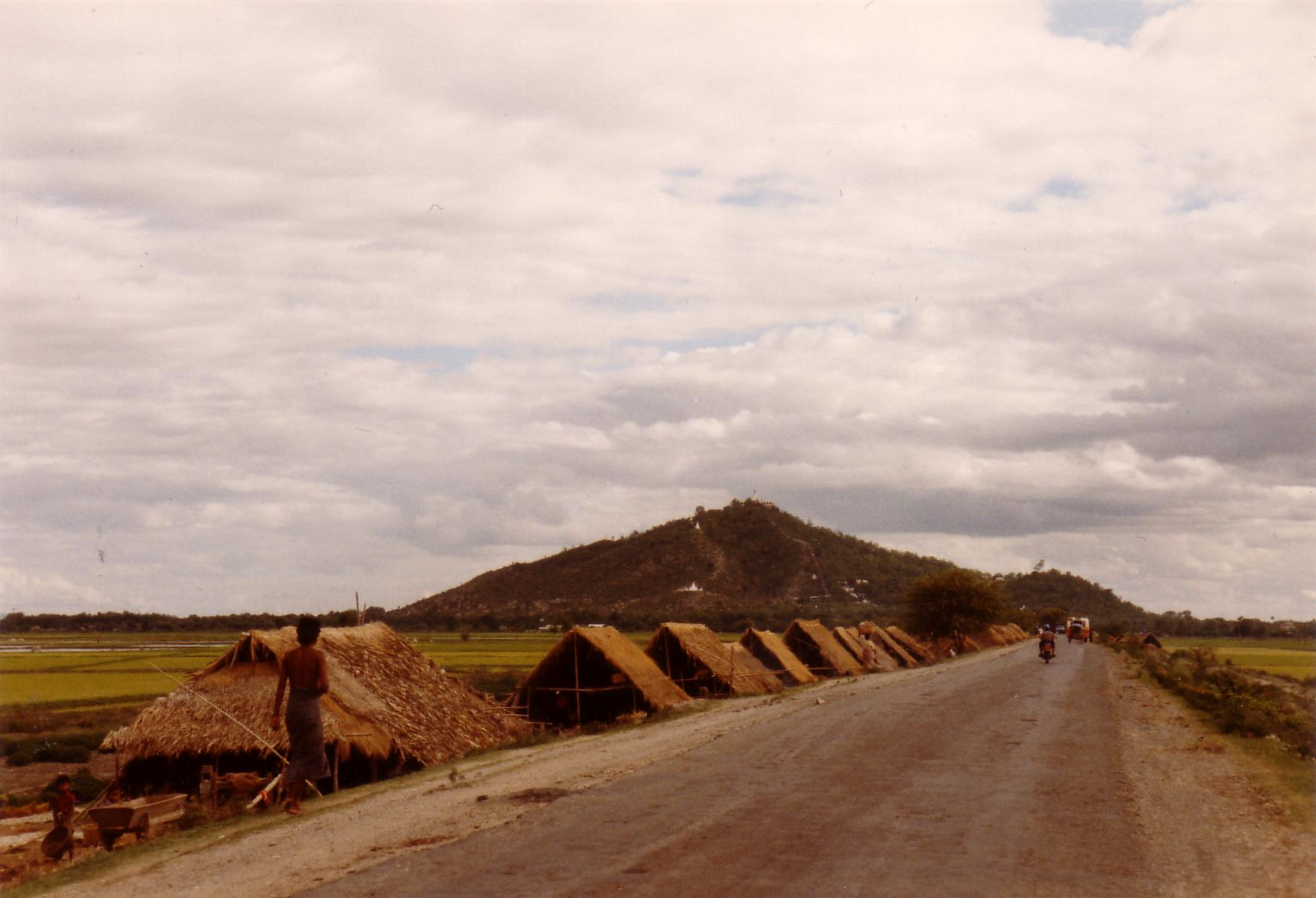
View from the north, Madaya Road

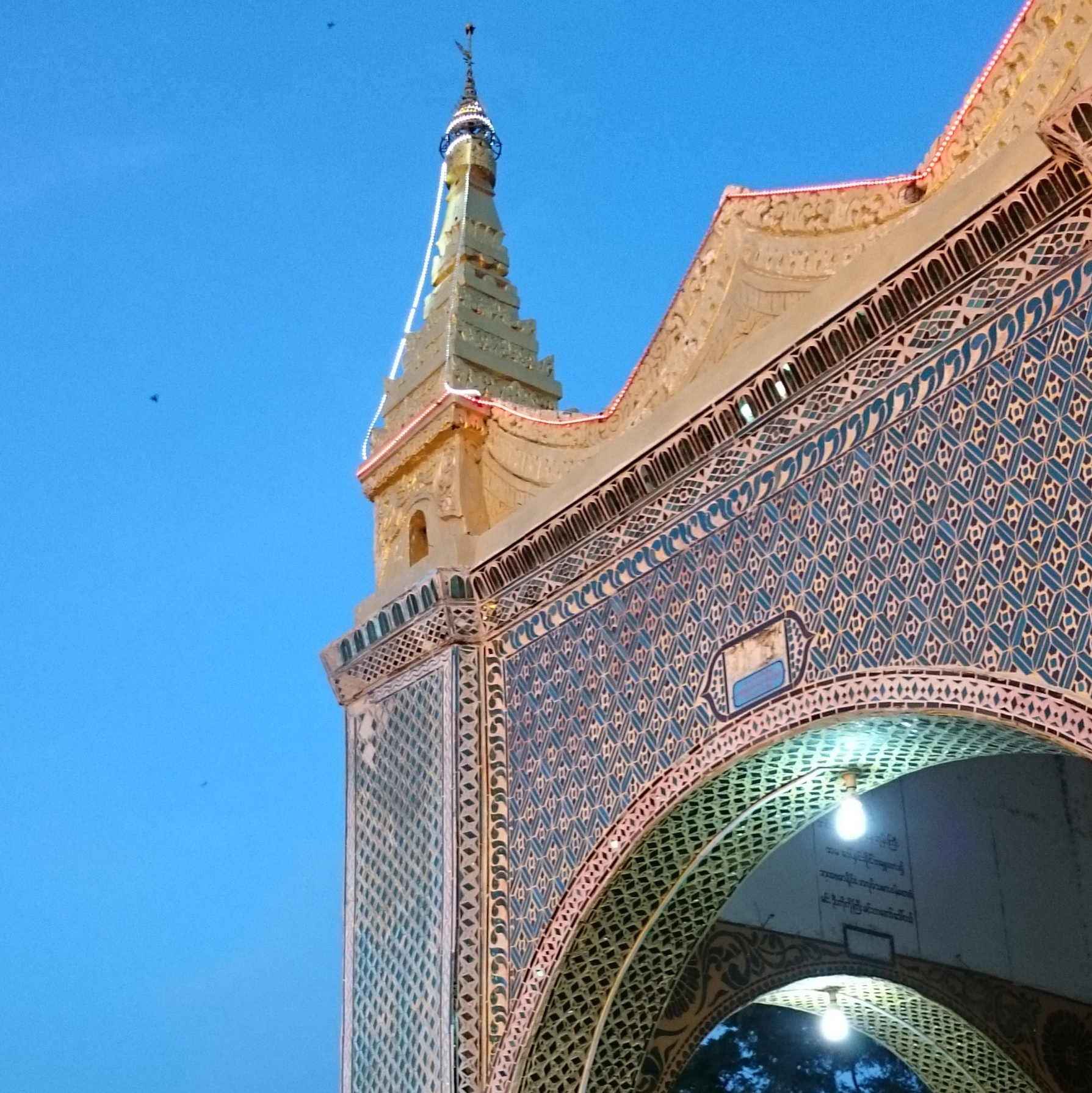
Detail of part of the Sutaungpyai Temple

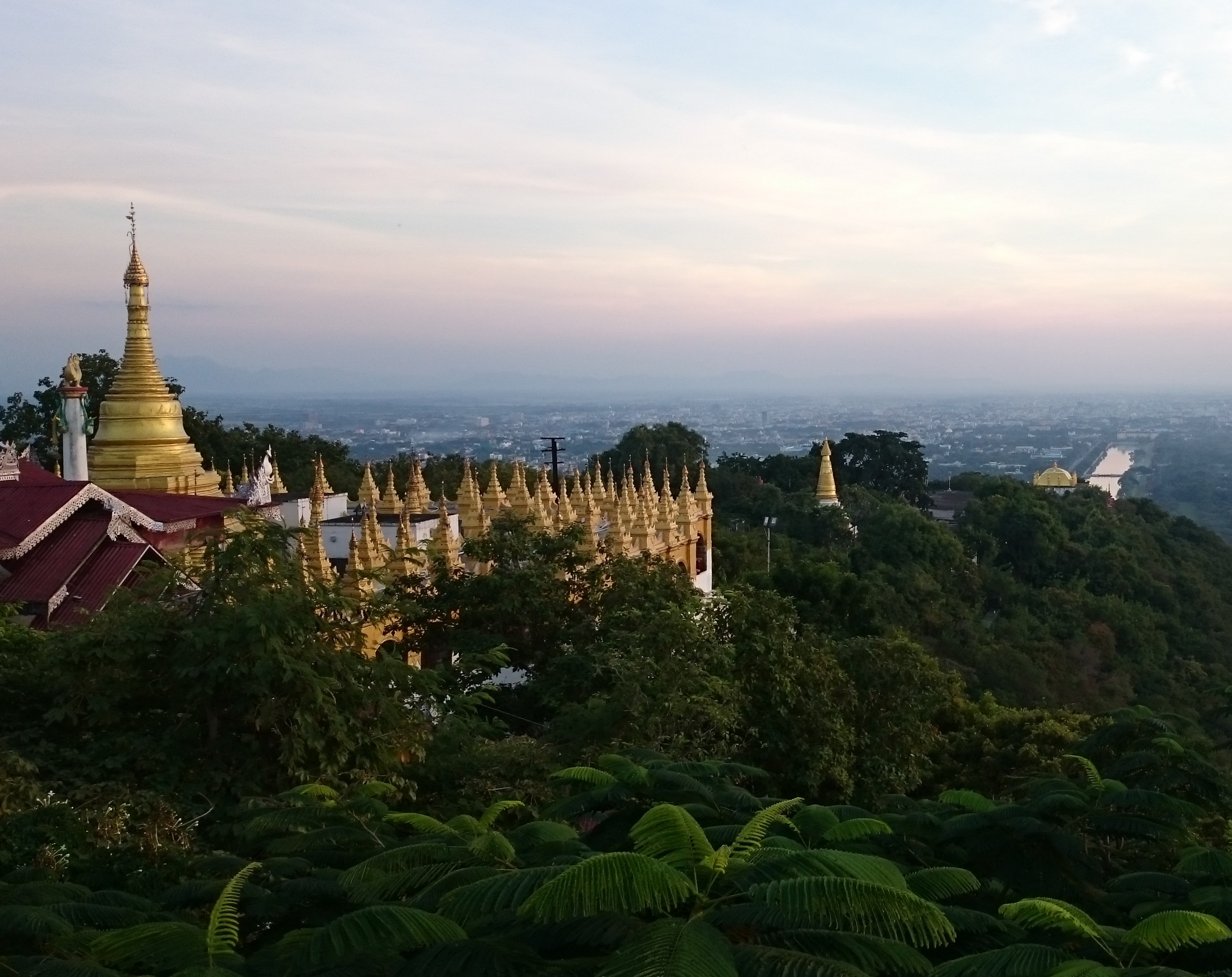
View from Mandalay Hill

== See also ==
- Sandamuni Pagoda
- Kuthodaw Pagoda
- Tripiṭaka tablets at Kuthodaw Pagoda
- List of mountains in Burma
