= Kuthodaw Pagoda =

Buddhist Pagoda with world's largest book in Myanmar

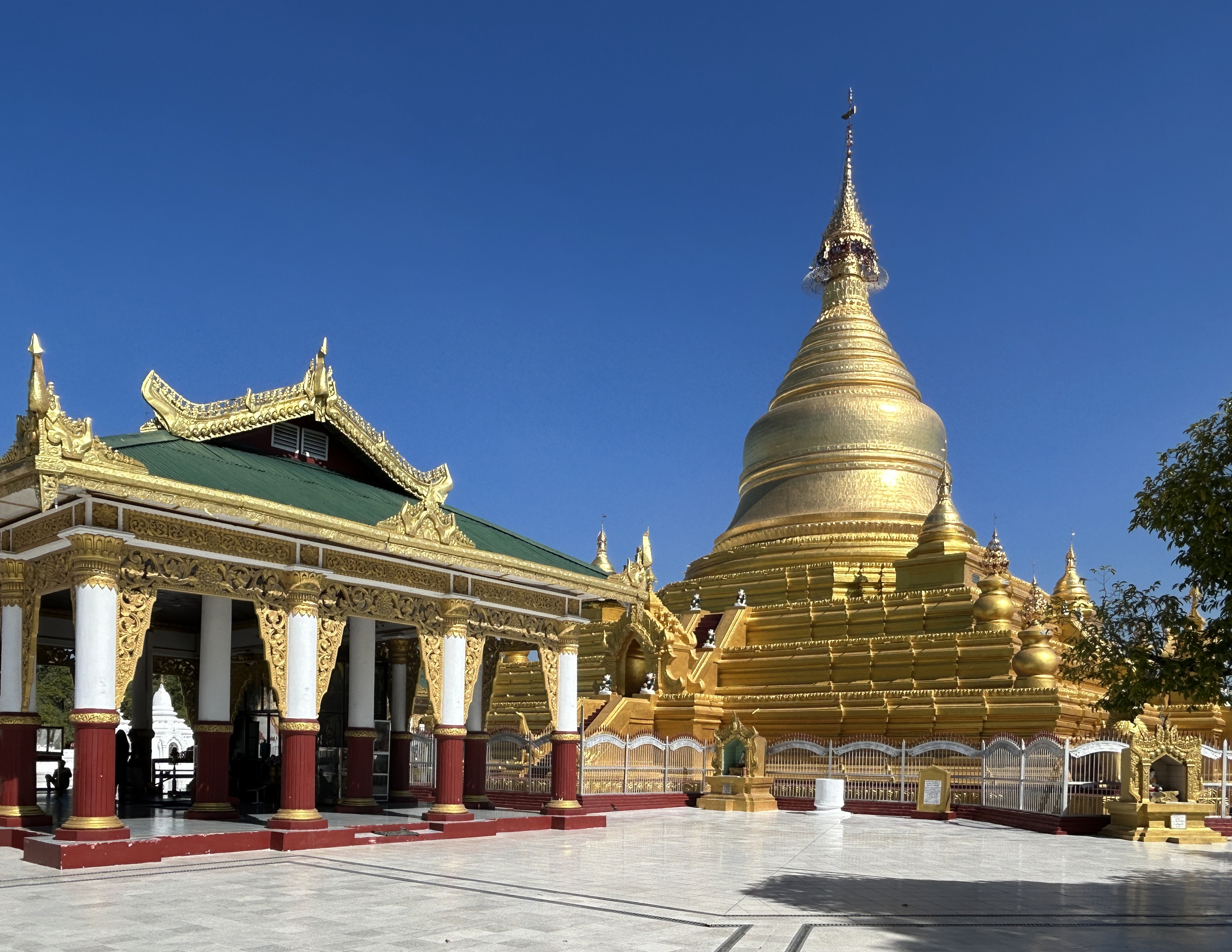
- Kuthodaw Pagoda from the southeast terrace

- Location within Myanmar

Religion
- Affiliation: Theravada Buddhism

Location
- Location: Mandalay
- Country: Myanmar
- Coordinates: 22.004712°N 96.112902°E

Architecture
- Founder: King Mindon Min
- Completed: May 4, 1868; 158 years ago

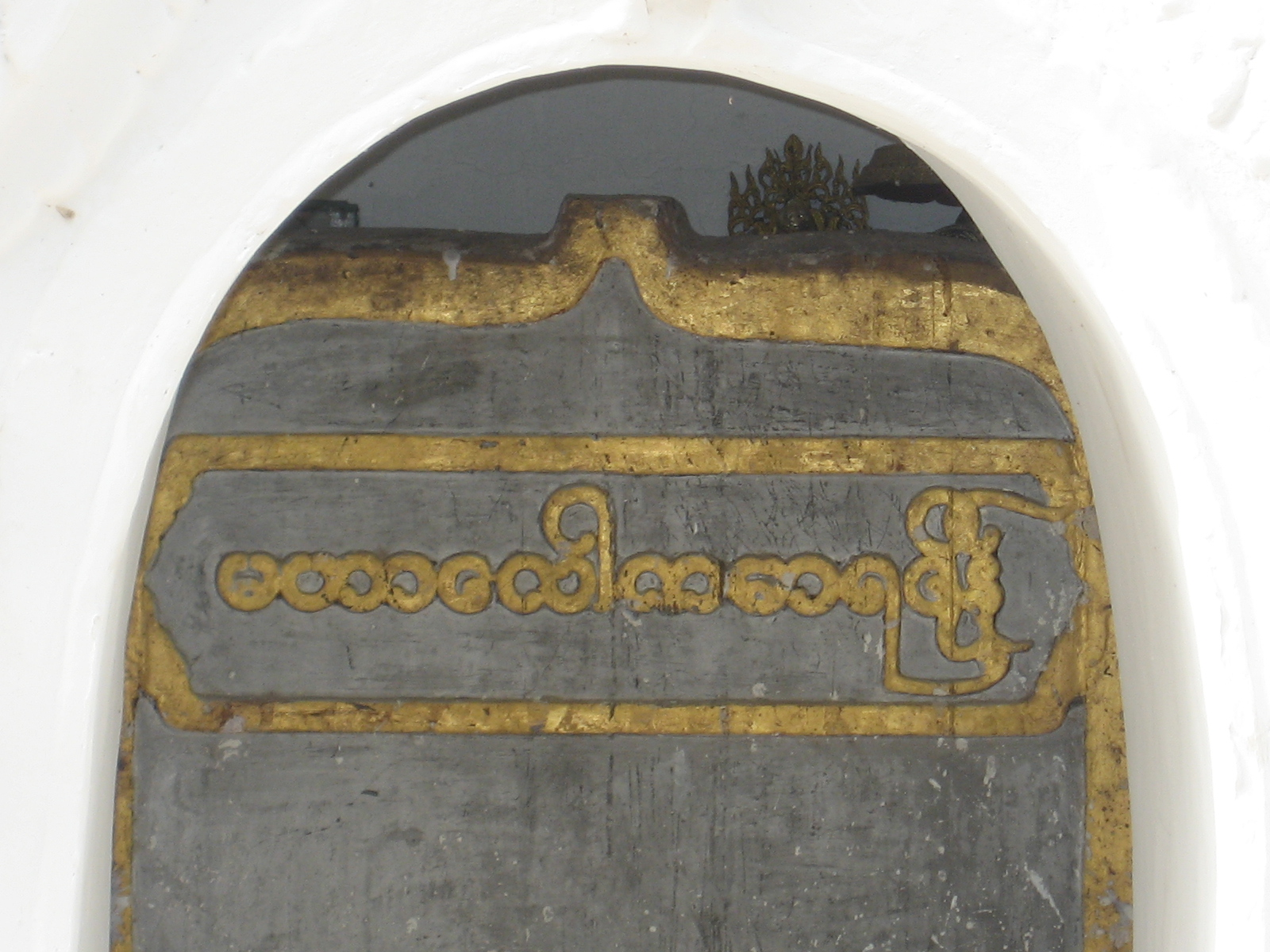
Marble inscription in gold of the Kuthodaw's formal title Mahalawka Marazein

Kuthodaw Pagoda (Burmese: ကုသိုလ်တော်‌ဘုရား, pronounced [kṵðòdɔ̀ pʰəjá]; lit. 'Royal Merit', and formally titled Mahalawka Marazein မဟာလောကမာရဇိန်စေတီ) is a Buddhist stupa, located in Mandalay, Burma (Myanmar), that contains the world's largest book. It lies at the foot of Mandalay Hill and was built during the reign of King Mindon (1853–1878). The stupa itself, which is gilded above its terraces, is 188 feet (57 m) high, and is modelled after the Shwezigon Pagoda at Nyaung-U near Bagan. In the grounds of the pagoda are 729 kyauksa gu or stone-inscription caves, each containing a marble slab inscribed on both sides with a page of text from the Tipitaka, the entire Pali Canon of Theravada Buddhism.

== Royal merit ==
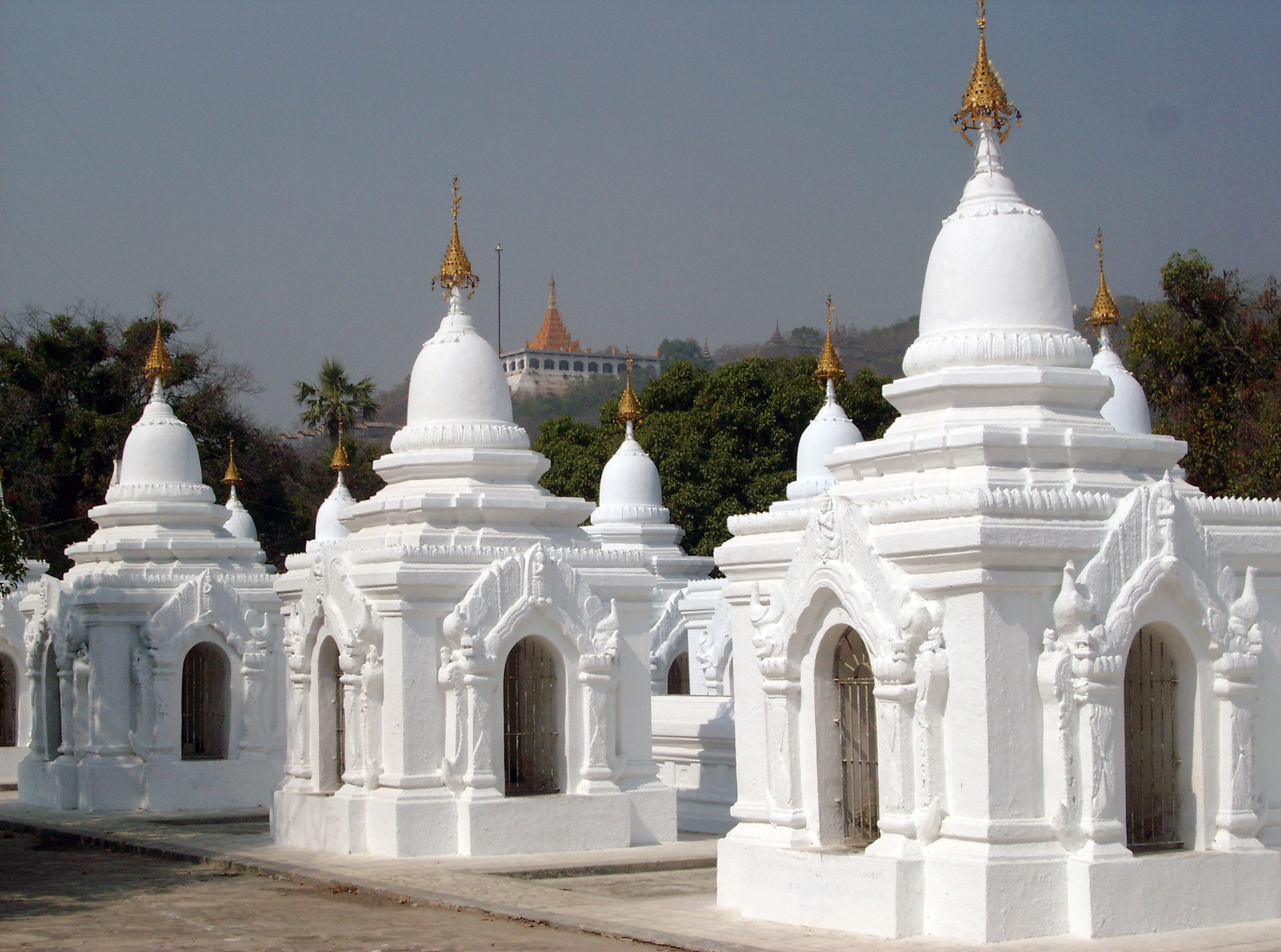
Some of the 729 stupas known as the world's largest book at the Kuthodaw Pagoda

Mindon Min had the pagoda built as part of the traditional foundations of the new royal city of Mandalay in 1857. He was later to convene the Fifth Buddhist Synod in 1871, but wanted to leave a great work of merit by having the Tipitaka set in stone for posterity, meant to last five millennia after the Buddha. Construction began in 1860, its hti (umbrella or crown) mounted on 19 July 1862, and the inscriptions were laid open to the public on 4 May 1868. They were arranged in neat rows within three enclosures, 42 in the first, 168 in the middle and 519 in the third. One more stands at the southeast corner of the first enclosure making it 730, and this stone records how it all came into being. Thirty four brick zayats (rest houses) stood all around except on the east side of the pagoda.

The main entrance is from the south through massive but open teak doors ornately carved with floral designs, scrolls, and Deva Nats. It is a covered approach or saungdan as in most Burmese pagodas with frescoes under the roof. Between the rows of stone-inscription stupas grow mature star flower trees (Mimusops elengi) that emanate a jasmine-like fragrance to the entire complex. Burmese families may be seen having a picnic in the cool shade under these trees, picking the flowers to make star flower chains for the Buddha or to wear in their hair, or the children playing hide and seek among the rows of stupas. On the southwest inner terrace is one very old tree believed to be 250 years old, its low spreading boughs propped up by supports.

== Annexation and desecration ==
After the annexation of Mandalay by the British in 1885, the walled city with Mandalay Palace became Fort Dufferin, and troops were billeted all around Mandalay Hill in the monasteries, temples and pagodas. They became off-limits to the public and Burmese were no longer allowed to visit their religious sites. One revenue surveyor called U Aung Ban then came up with the idea of appealing directly to Queen Victoria since she had promised to respect all religions practised by her subjects. To their amazement and great joy, the British queen promptly ordered the withdrawal of all her troops from religious precincts in 1890. This however turned to great sadness when they found that the pagoda had been looted from the hti, left lying on the ground stripped of its bells, gold, silver, diamonds, rubies and other precious stones, down to the Italian marble tiles from its terraces. The zayats lay in utter ruin and the bricks had been used to build a road for the troops. All the brass bells from all the kyauksa gu stupas were gone, 9 on each making it 6570 in total. The gold ink from the letters as well as the sides and top of each marble slab had also disappeared. All the biloos along the corridors had lost their heads, and the marble eyes and claws from the masonry chinthes were gone.

== Restoration ==
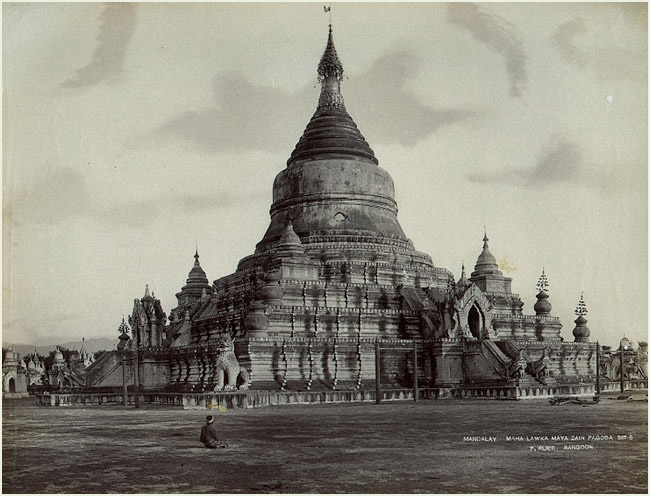
A photo of Kuthodaw Pagoda in the 1870s.

In 1892, a committee of senior monks, members of the royal family and former officers of the king, including Atumashi Sayadaw (the Abbot of Atumashi Monastery), Kinwon Min Gyi U Kaung (chancellor), Hleithin Atwinwun (minister of the royal fleet), Yaunghwe Saopha Sir Saw Maung and Mobyè Sitkè (a general of the royal army), was formed to start restoration works with the help and donations from the families of the original donors, according to custom, and also from the public.

It was the sitkè who asked permission from the senior monks to plant the hkayei star flower trees as well as some meze (Madhuca longifolia) trees. Gold letters were replaced with black ink which made it easier to read. The metal htis of the kyauksa gus were replaced with stone paid for by members of the royal family (155), former officers of the royal army (58), Shan Saophas and Myosas (102), and public donations (414). In 1913 Sir Po Tha, a rice trader of Rangoon, had the pagoda repaired and regilded. The next year, the Society of Pitaka Stone Inscriptions gave an iron gate to the south left open as the carved wooden panels had been destroyed by the soldiers. The west gate was donated by the famous zat mintha (theatre performer) U Po Sein the following year, and the north and east gates by the children and grandchildren of King Mindon in 1932. In 1919 the hermit U Khandi led the rebuilding of the south and west saungdans (covered approaches).

== UNESCO inscription ==
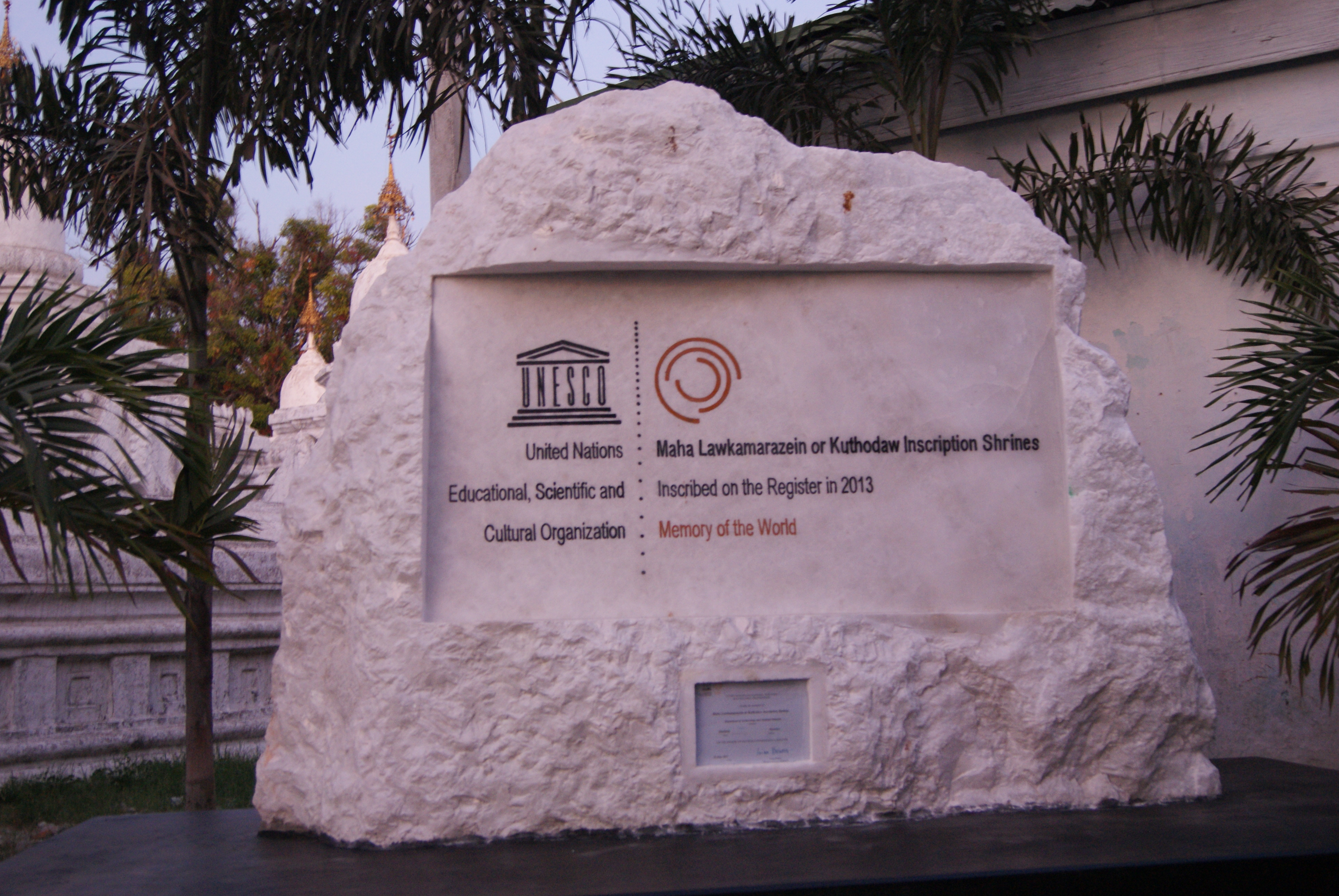
UNESCO plaque

In 2013, UNESCO plaque indicating that the Maha Lawkamarazein or Kuthodaw Inscription Shrines at Kuthodaw Pagoda, which contain the world's largest book in the form of 729 marble slabs on which are inscribed the Tripitaka, were inscribed on to the Memory of the World Register.

== Gallery ==
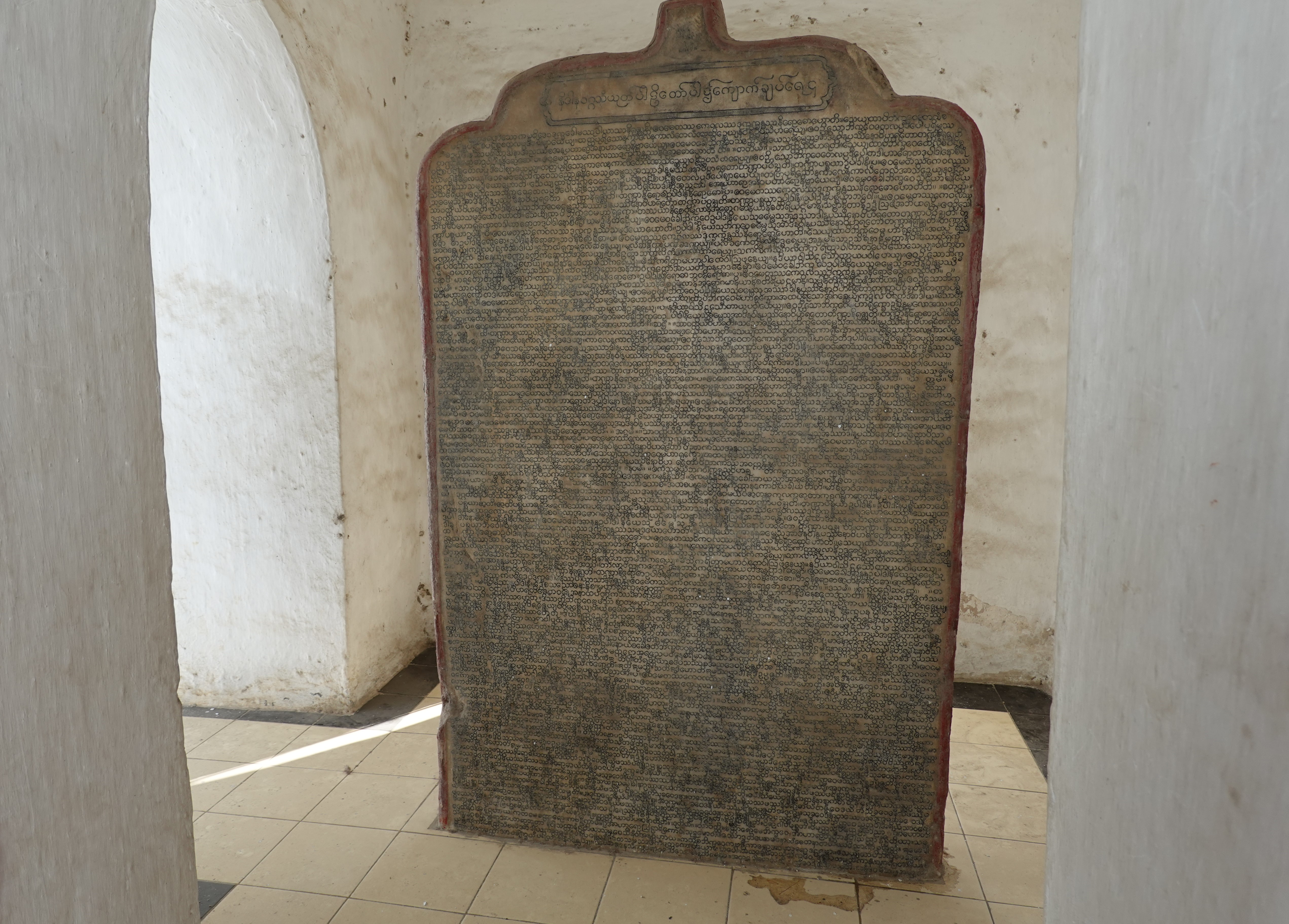
One of the stone inscriptions, originally in gold letters and borders, at Kuthodaw

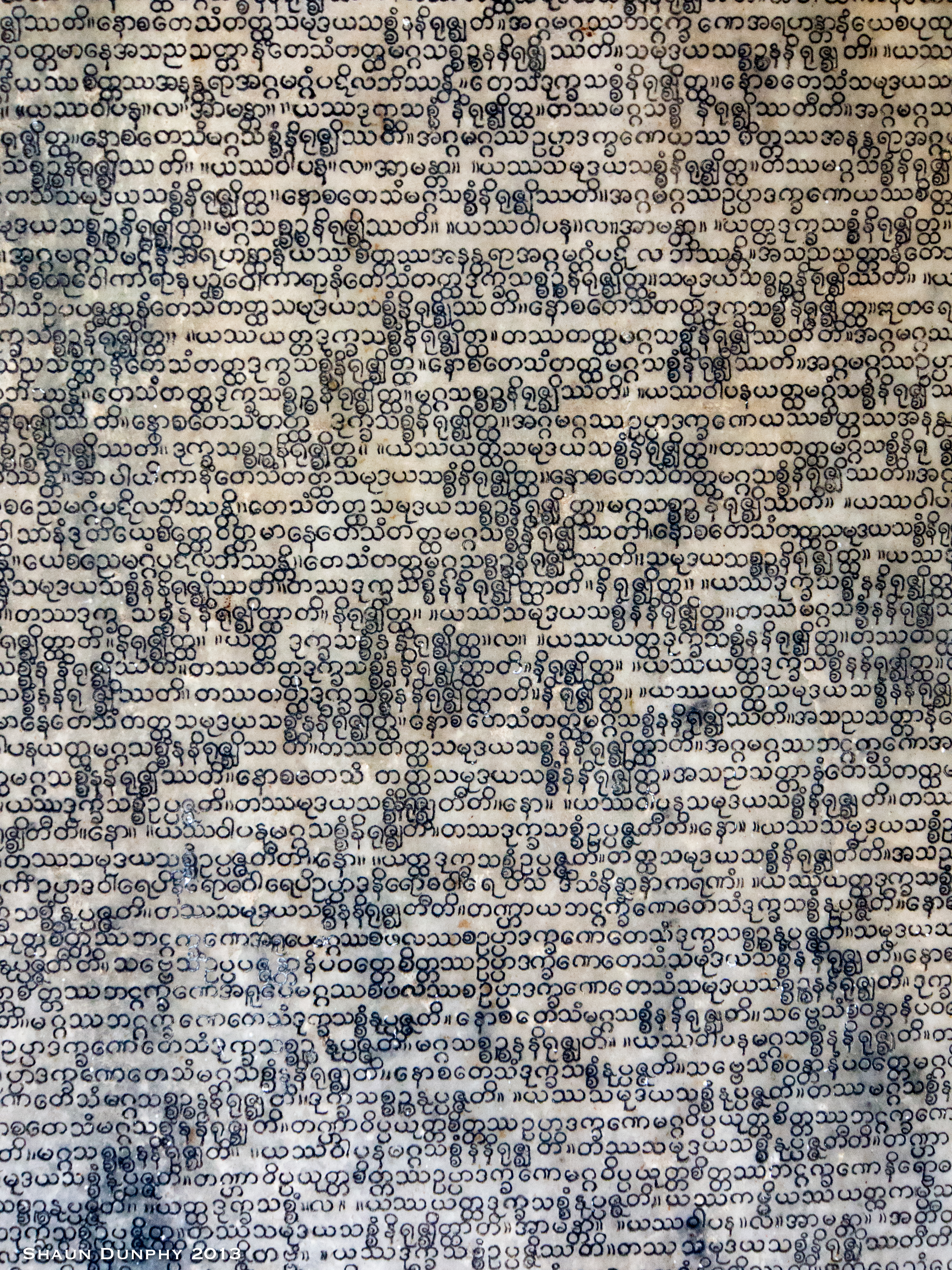
Detail of the lettering on one of Kuthodaw's stone tablets

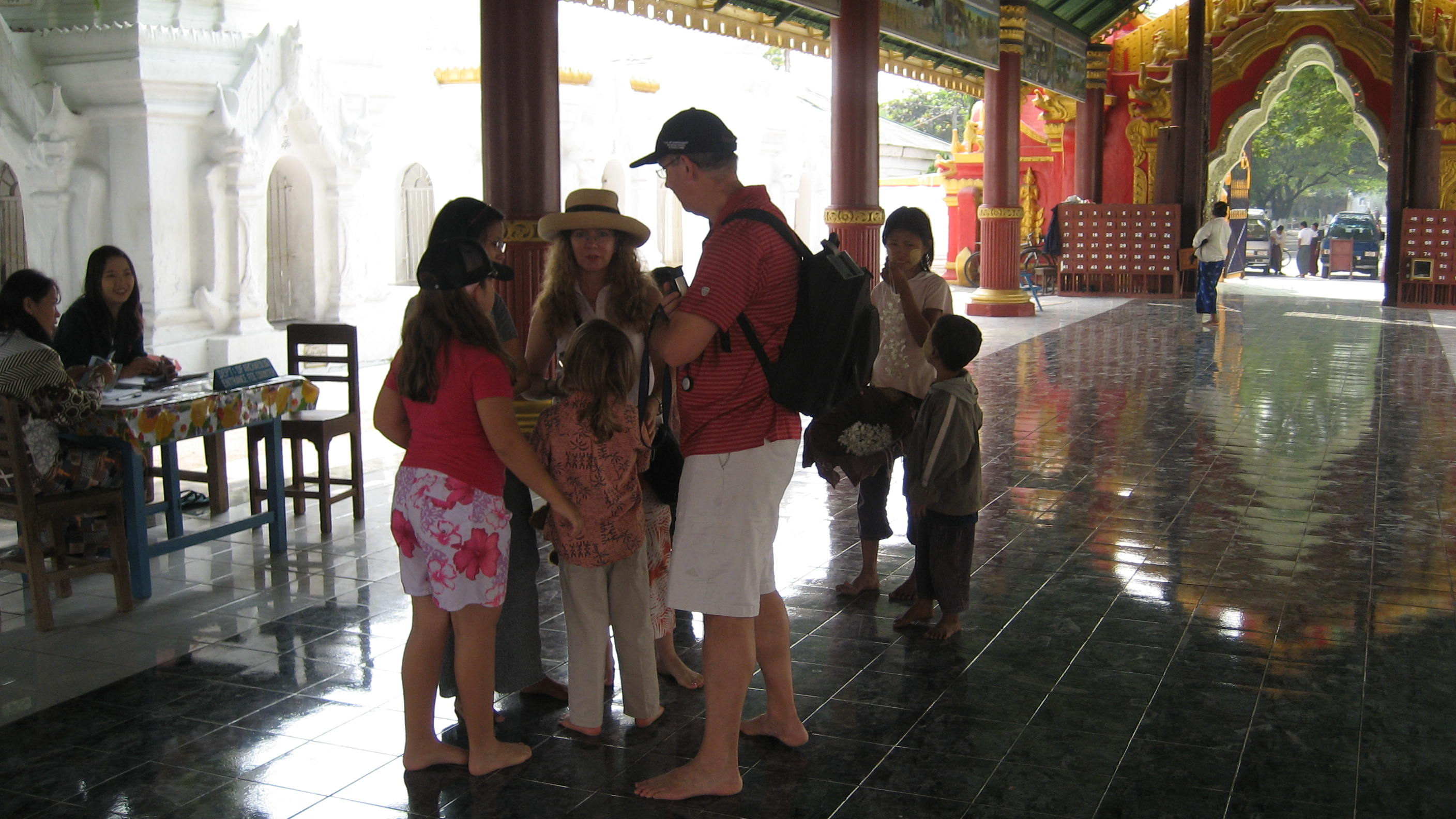
Saungdan (covered approach) to Kuthodaw from the south

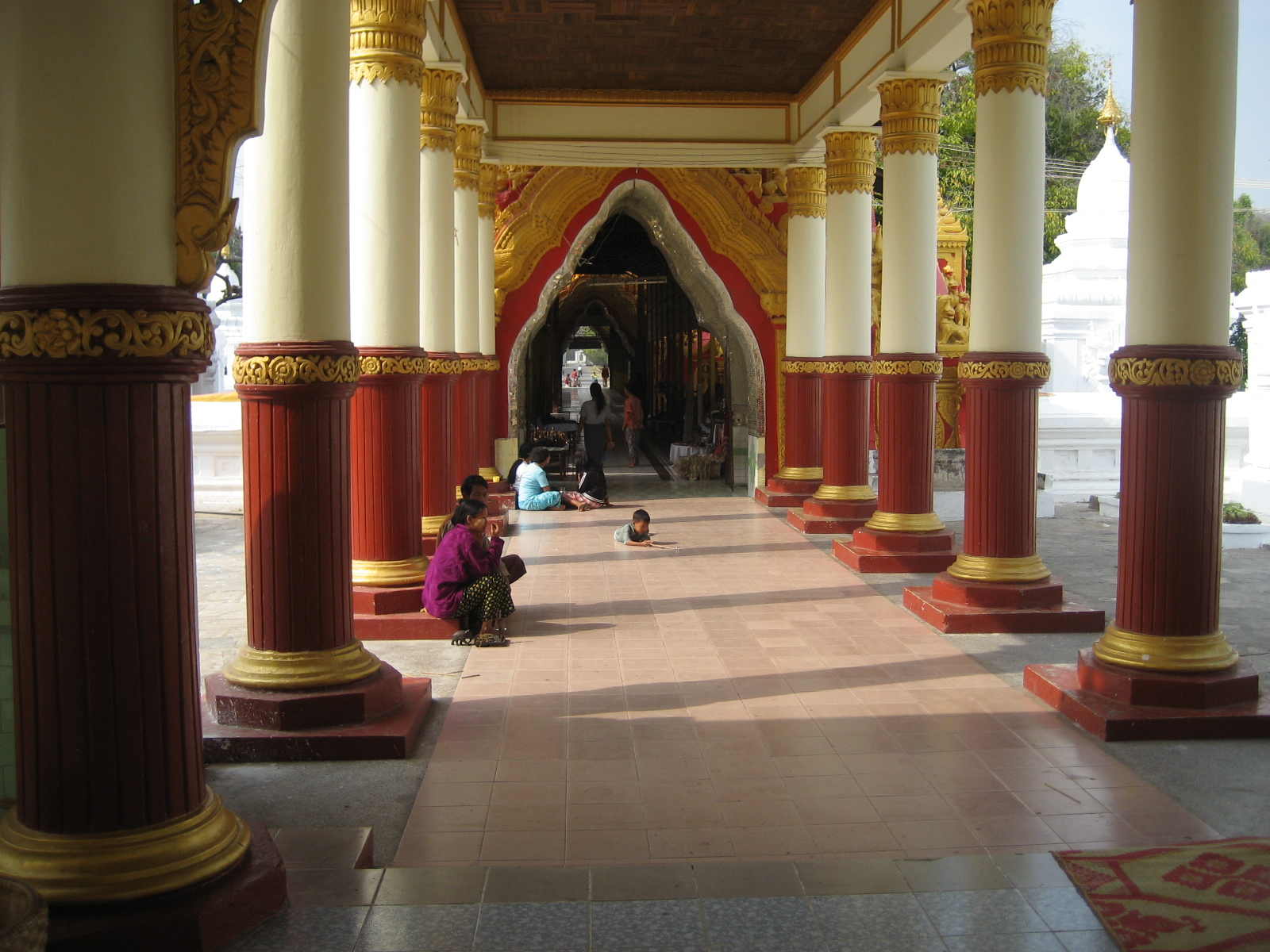
The west saungdan of Kuthodaw

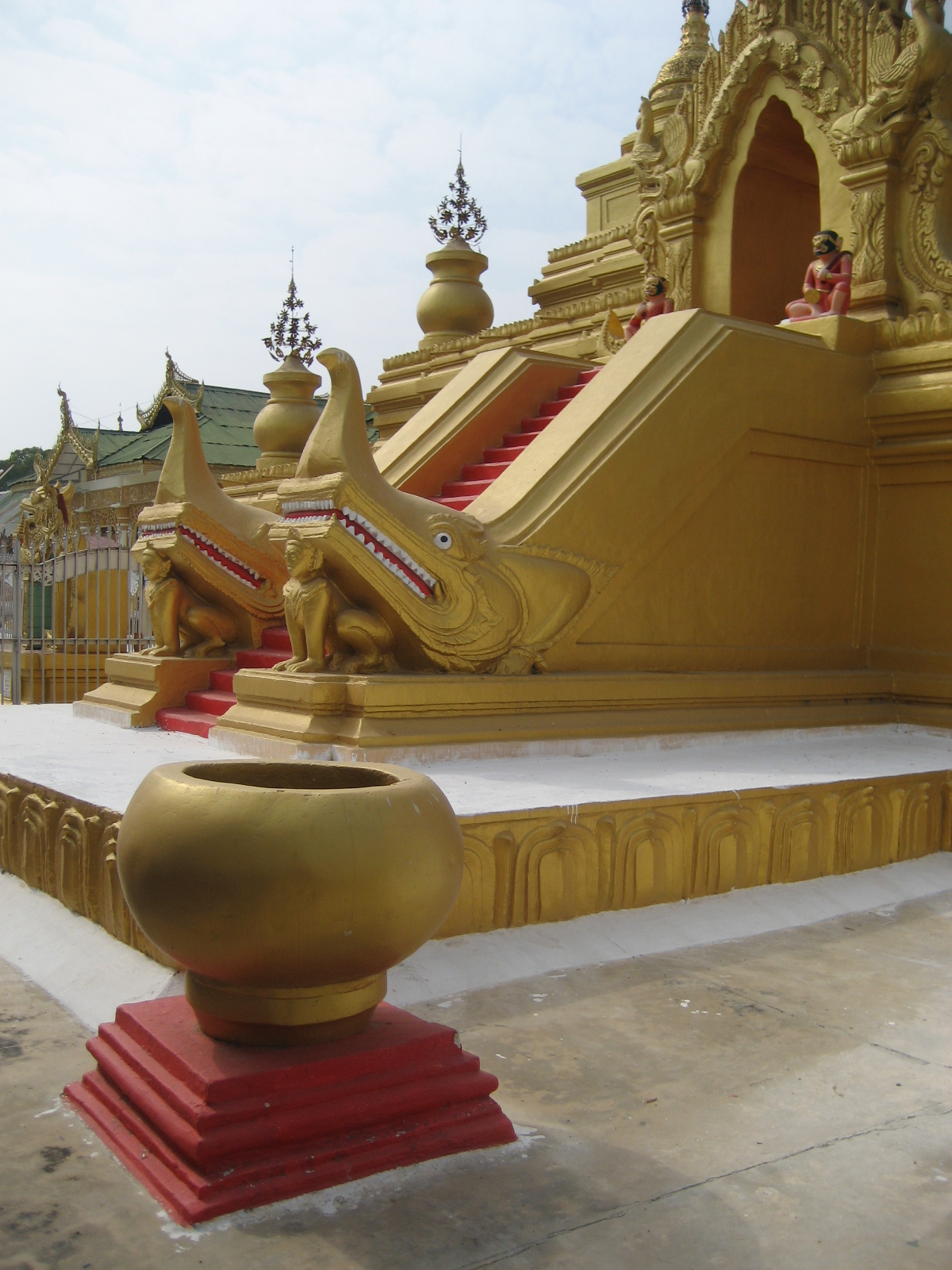
Stairs to the upper terrace of Kuthodaw guarded by mythical creatures

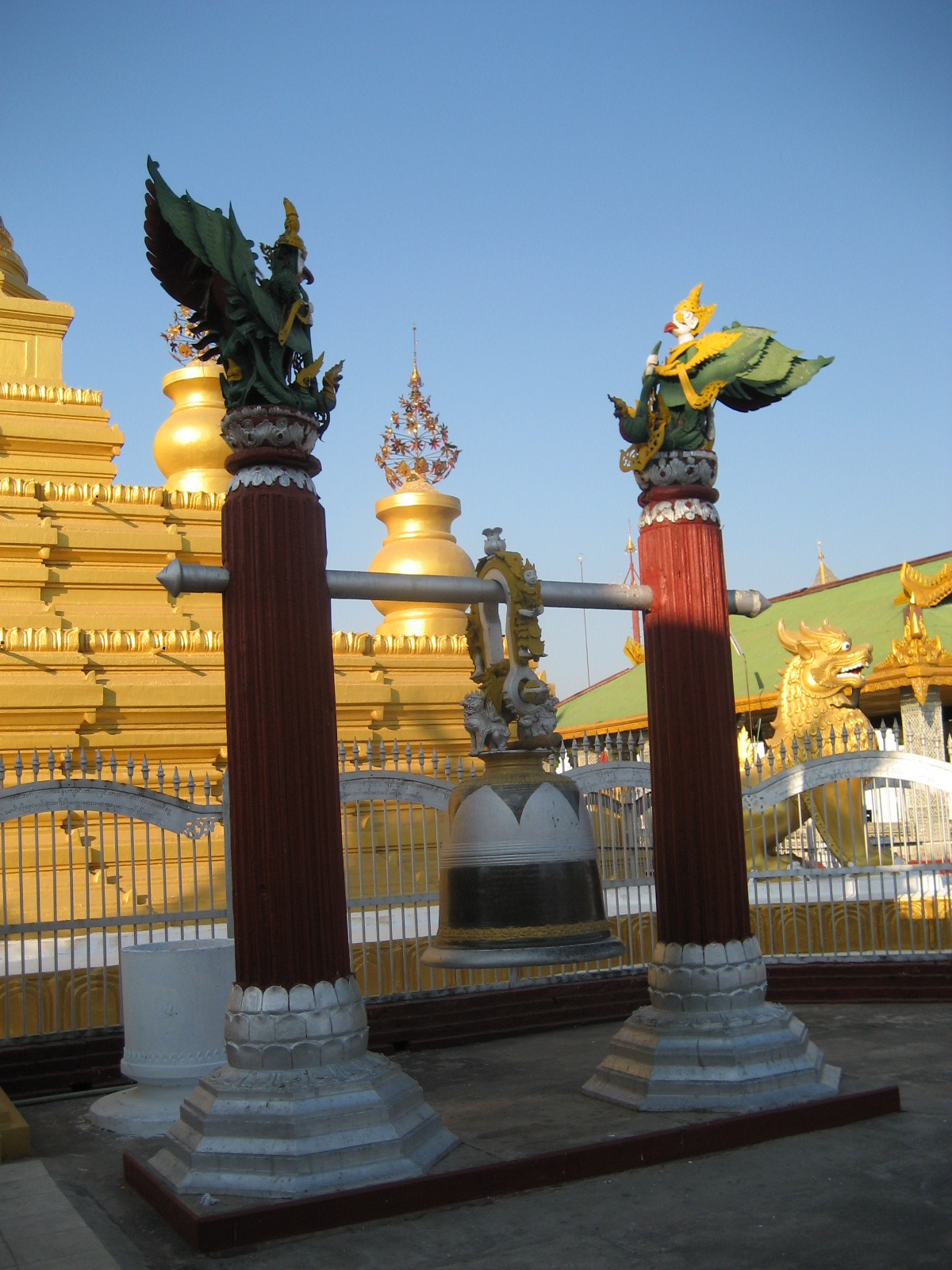
The bell at Kuthodaw

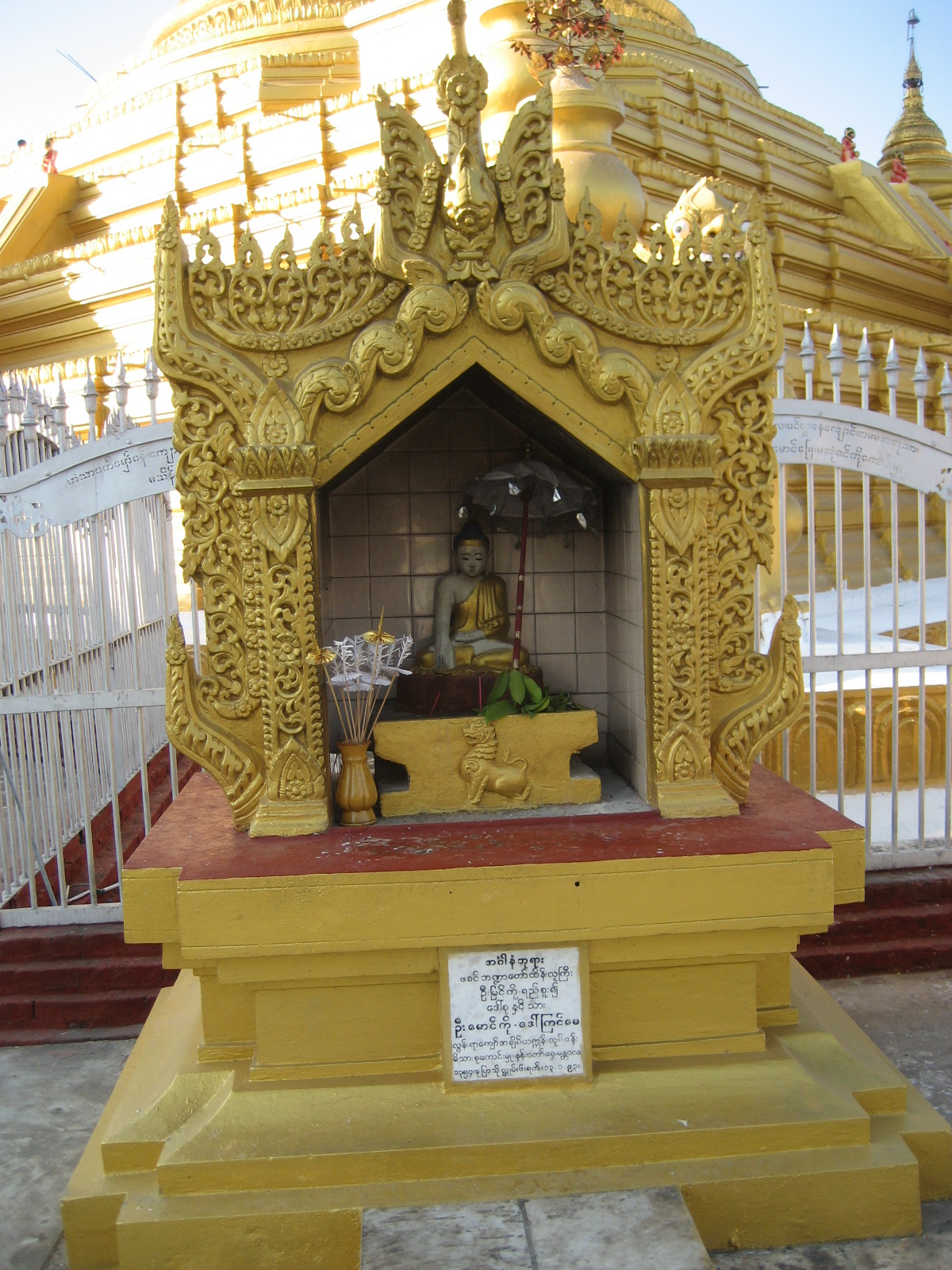
Inga nan paya - the small Buddha shrine for the planetary post Mercury at Kuthodaw

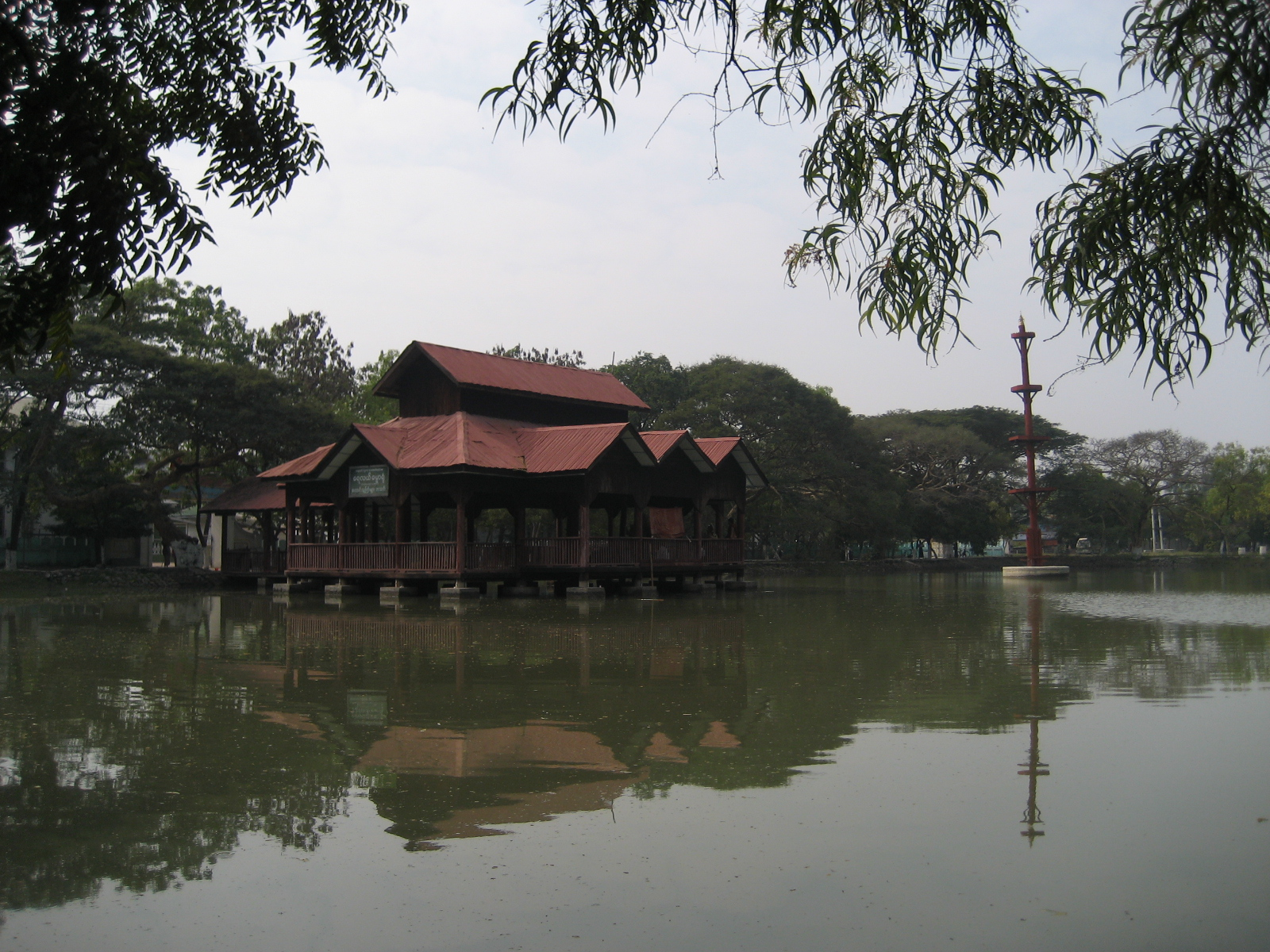
A zayat on the reservoir south of Kuthodaw

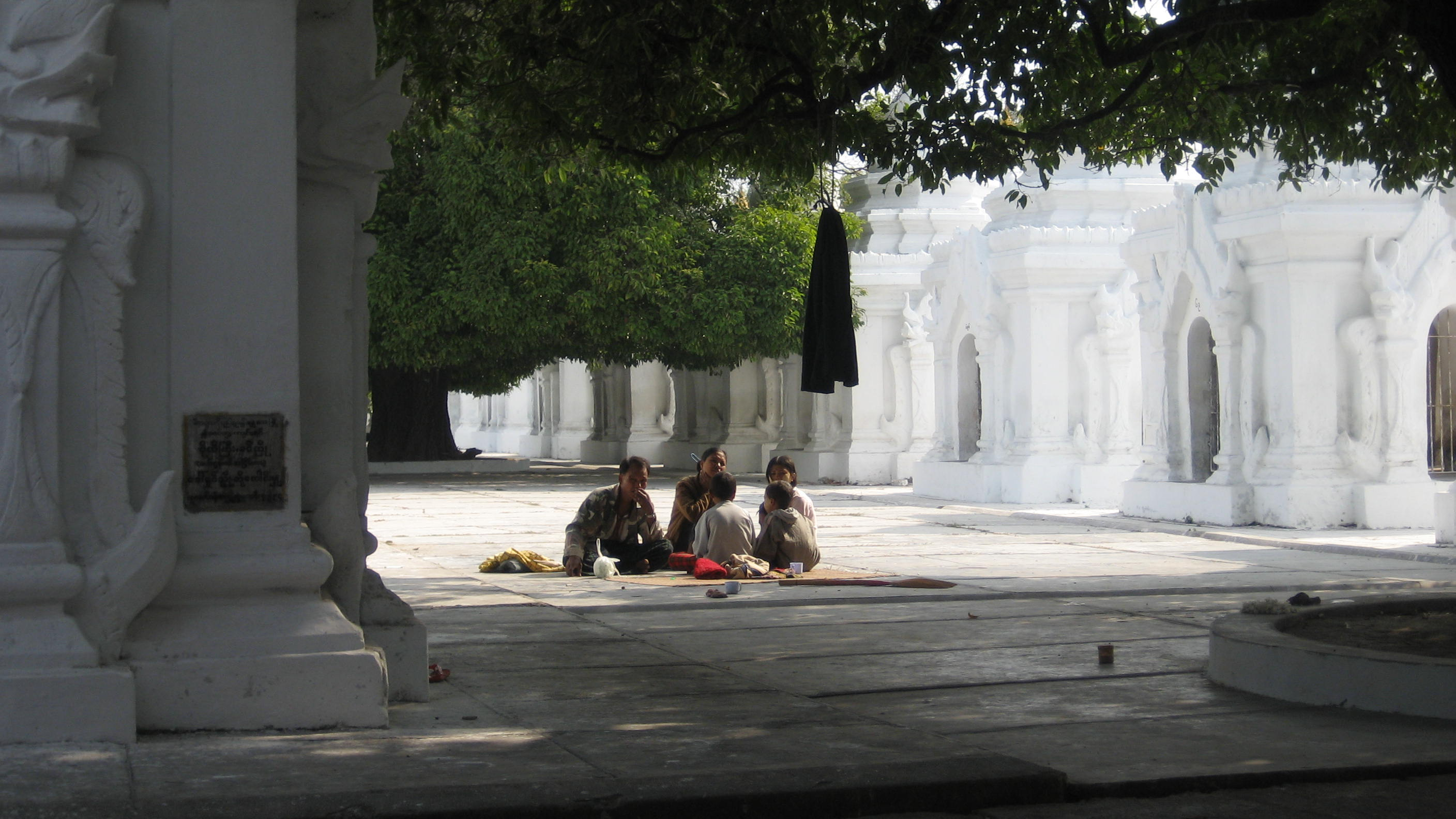
A family picnic at Kuthodaw under the star flower trees

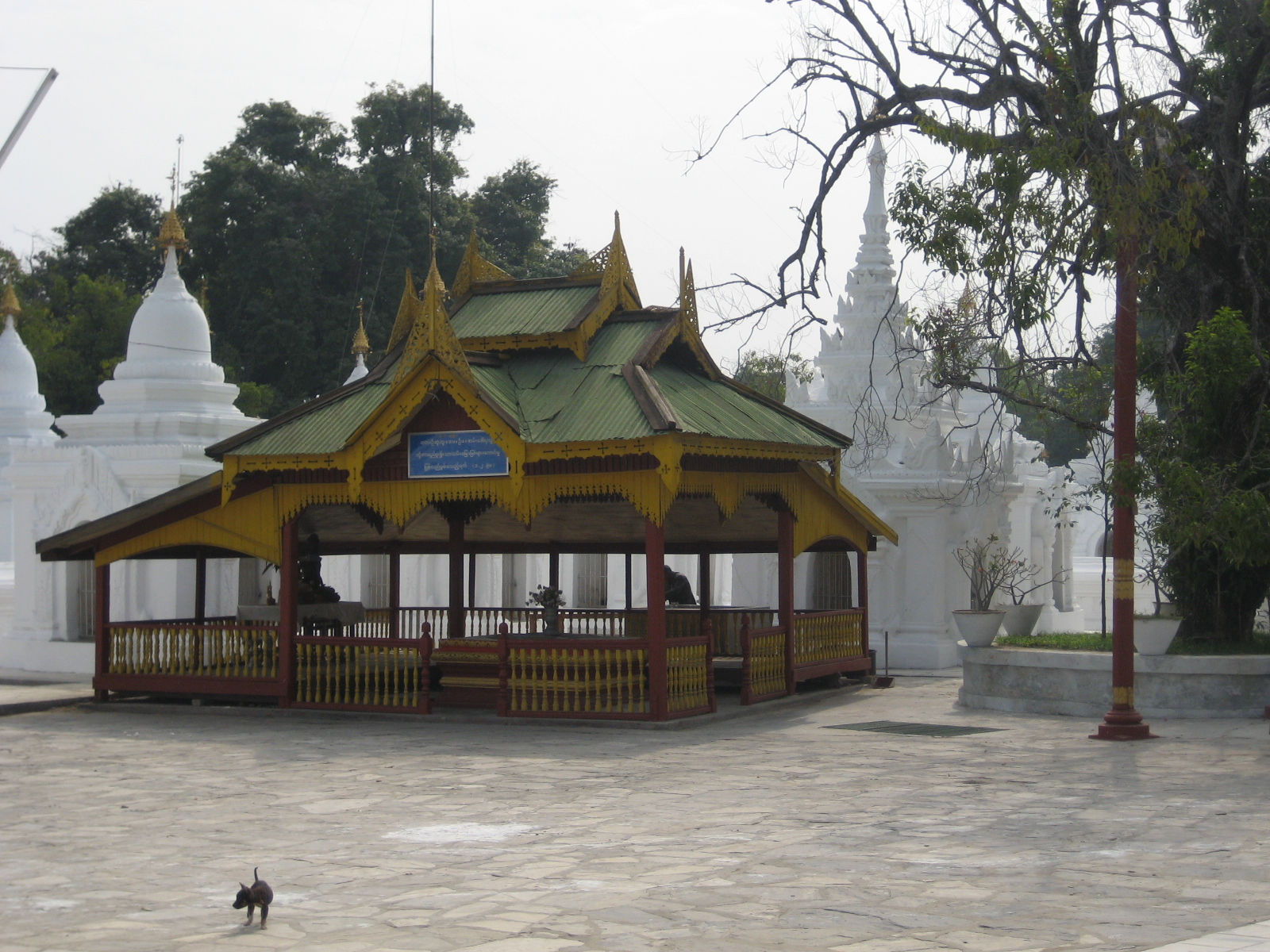
A zayat on the southeast terrace of Kuthodaw

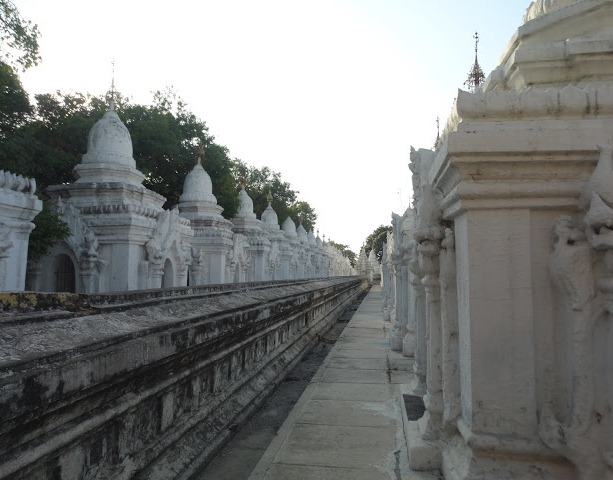
Kuthodaw pagoda, the wall

Kuthodaw Paya from Mandalay Hill

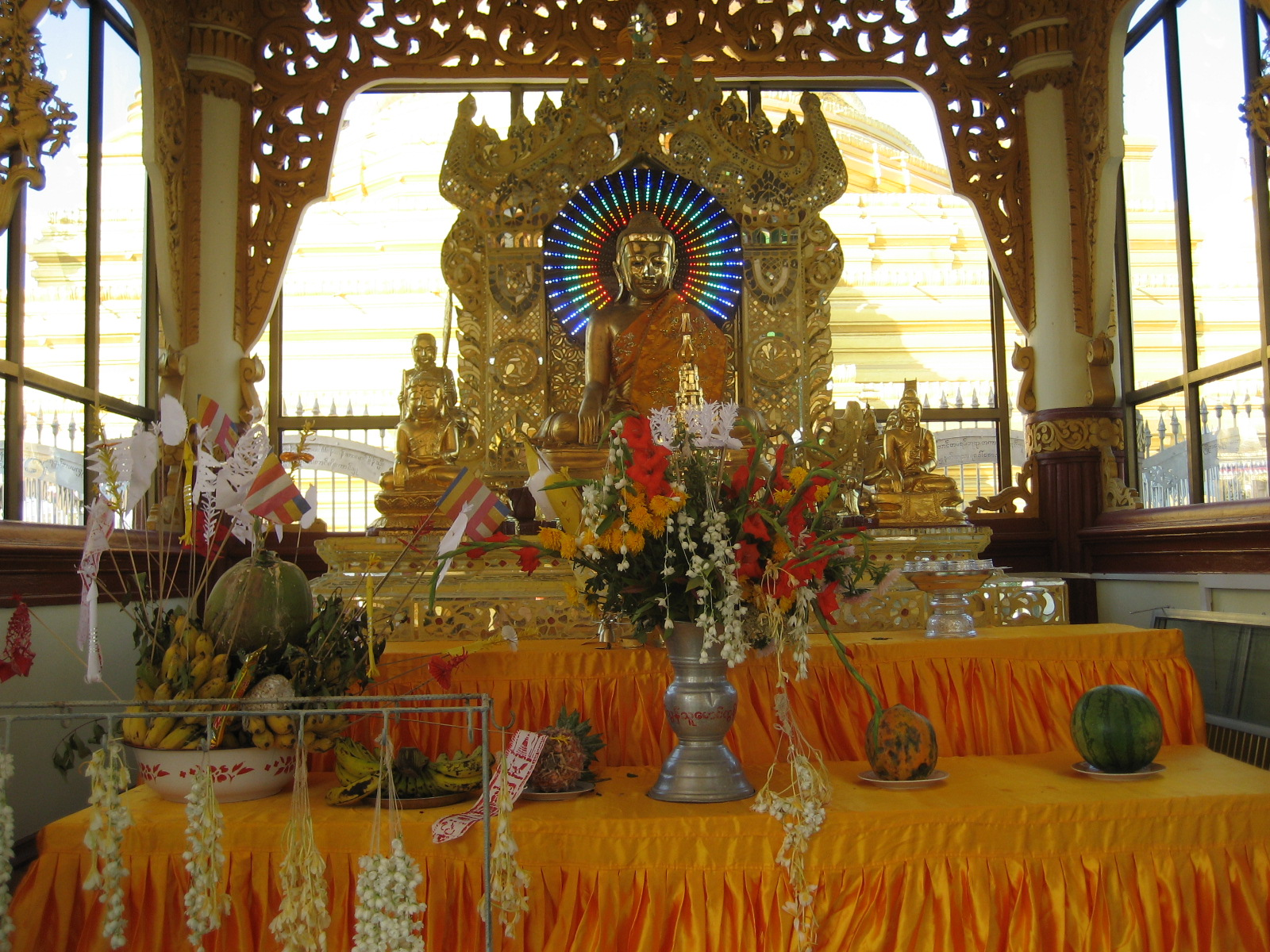
The main shrine at the end of the southern approach

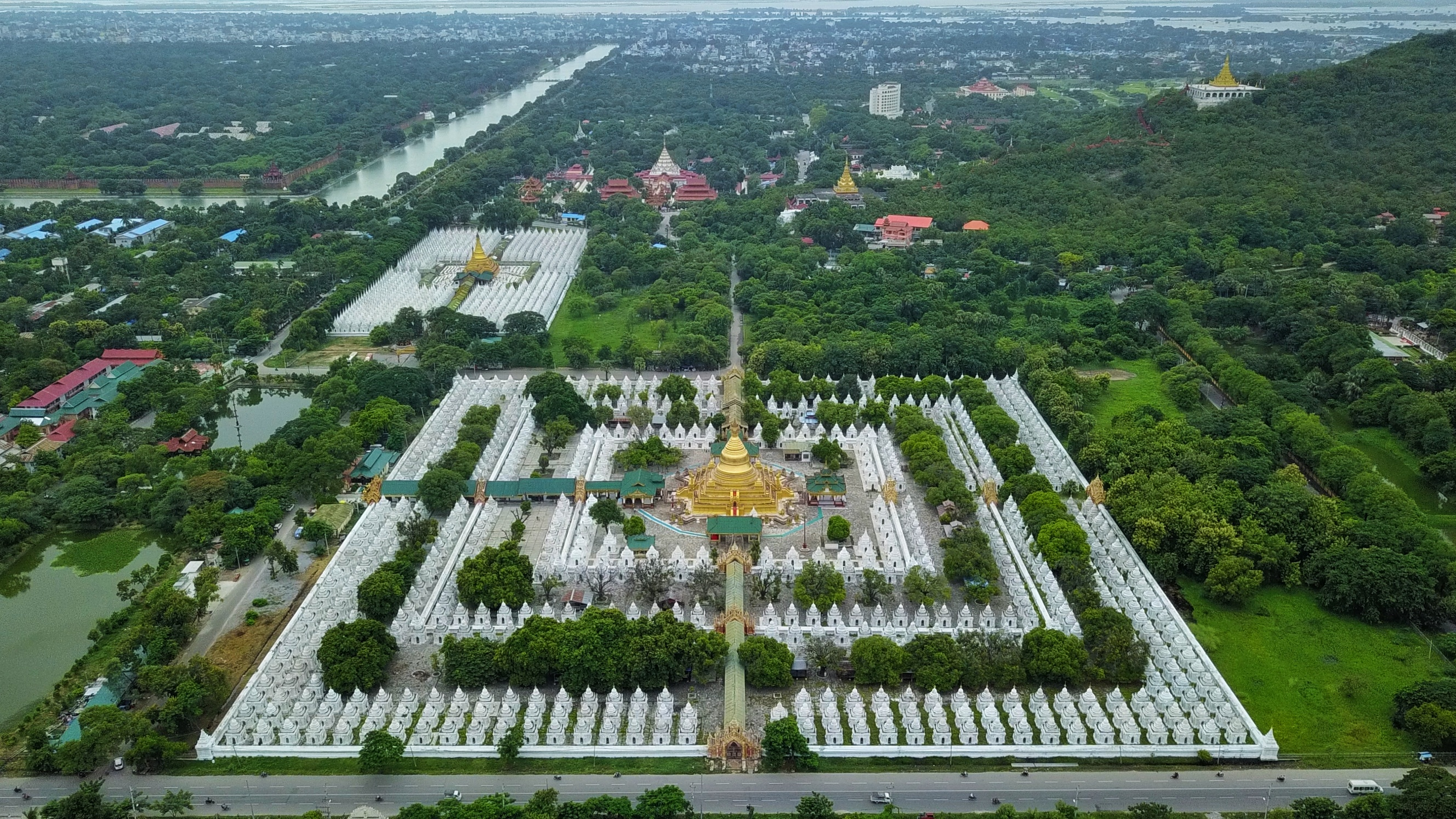
Kuthodaw Pagoda & Sandar Muni Pagoda

== See also ==
- Fifth Buddhist council
- World's largest book
