= Fifth Buddhist council =

1871 meeting of Buddhist monks

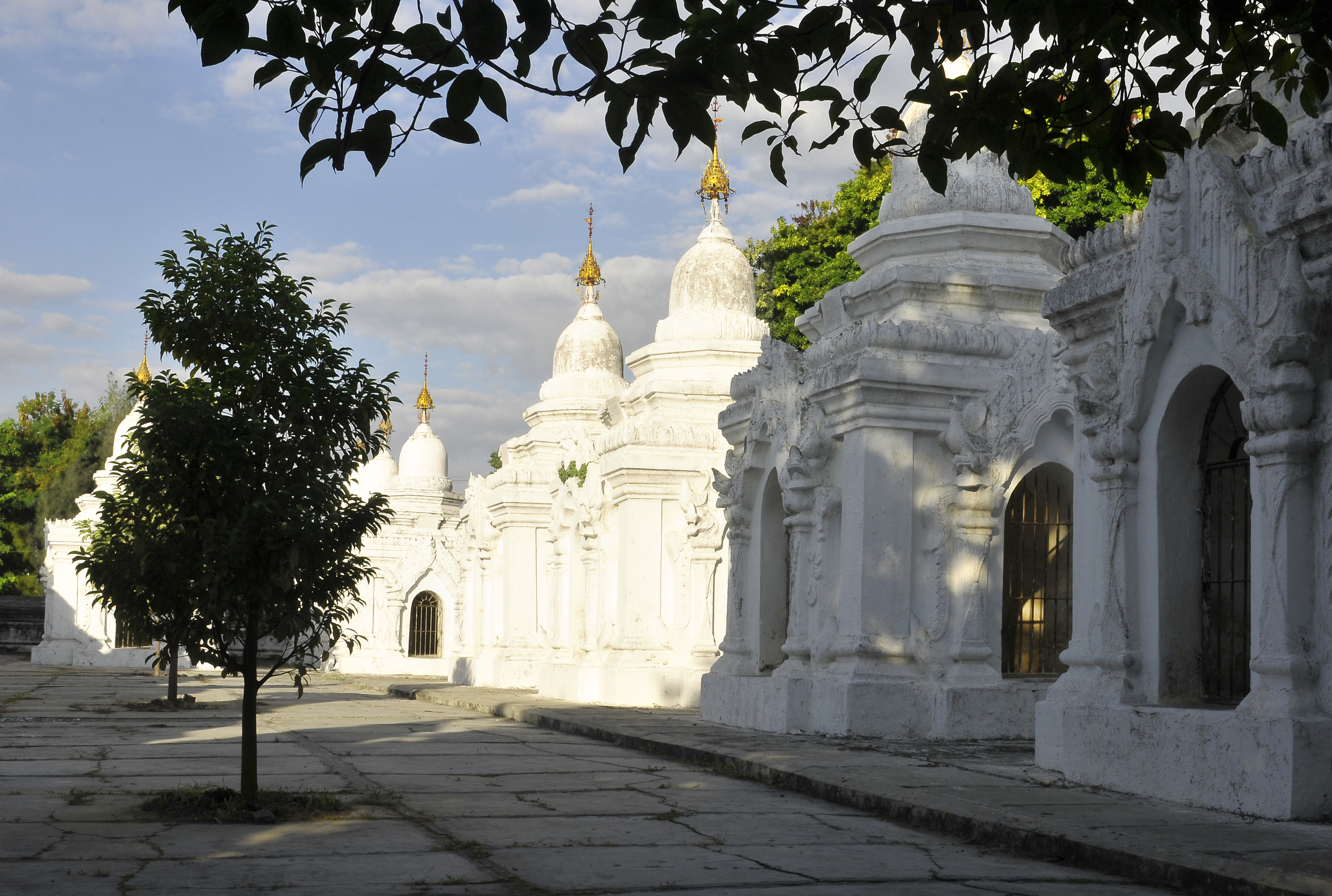
Some of the 729 stupas at Kuthodaw Temple

The Fifth Buddhist council (Burmese: ပဉ္စမသင်္ဂါယနာ; Pali: Pañcamasaṃgāyanā) took place in Mandalay, Burma (Myanmar) in 1871 CE under the auspices of King Mindon of Burma (Myanmar). The chief objective of this meeting was to recite all the teachings of the Gautama Buddha according to the Pāli Canon of Theravada Buddhism and examine them in minute detail to see if any of them had been altered, distorted or dropped.

It was presided over by three elder bhikkhus, Mahathera Jagarabhivamsa, Narindabhidhaja, and Mahathera Sumangalasami in the company of 2400 monks. Their joint Dhamma recitation lasted five months. The Venerable Ledi Sayadaw was responsible for the translation of the Kathāvatthu (Pali text) during the Fifth Buddhist Council. According to Pho Hlaing (Yaw Min Gyi), the wise minister of the Yadanarbon era, the monk Ashin Ñāṇadhaja (Ledi Sayadaw's ordination name) successfully completed the translation of the Kathāvatthu and its commentary (Kathāvatthu-aṭṭhakathā) while seated upon the royal throne in the Byè-taik (the inner court or royal treasury).At this council, Bhikkhu Nana-dhaja helped in the editing and translating of the Abhidhamma texts. Ven. Ledi Sayadaw (1846–1923) was a pivotal Burmese monk who revived Vipassana meditation (insight meditation) for both monastics and laypeople in modern times.

The Fifth Buddhist council was a Burmese affair, and most other Buddhist countries were not involved in it. It has been argued that, since the Theravadin multinational Sixth Buddhist council received the name of "Sixth Buddhist council", this involved implicitly recognizing the fifth, even though most other nations were not involved in the fifth council, and the results of the fifth council were limited to the Burmese edition of the Pali Canon only. However, there were a number of other councils held in Ceylon and Siam between the fourth and sixth, so the total can be made up in other ways.

(1) After 2,415 religious years, between the fourth and fifth time, it lasted about 2,000 years, so it was placed on the leaves because of the weather and the risk of insects, it could not last long, and the variations occurred.

(2) Religious year = (2415) years

(3) Location = Yadana Pone Nay Pyaytaw ( Mandalay, Myanmar )

(4) Leader = Lord Zagaramathera

(5) Number of monks = ordinary monks (2400)

(6) King =Mindon

(7) duration = oral recitation (5) months (3) days

On the 7th year (6th) month (14th day) of Kyauk Chettin - 2415 years of the religious year, the Tripitaka (the Buddhist texts) placed on the pe leaves were damaged due to the weather and the danger of insects and some variations occurred. (3) Together, they held a synod at the Yadana Pinayi Temple in Mandalay.

- After the oral recitation lasted for (5) months and (3) days, the scriptures were engraved on the marble slabs so that they would not be destroyed for as long as the world existed, and a total of (729) white marble slabs were obtained . It was very prominent as a proud landmark of Myanmar.

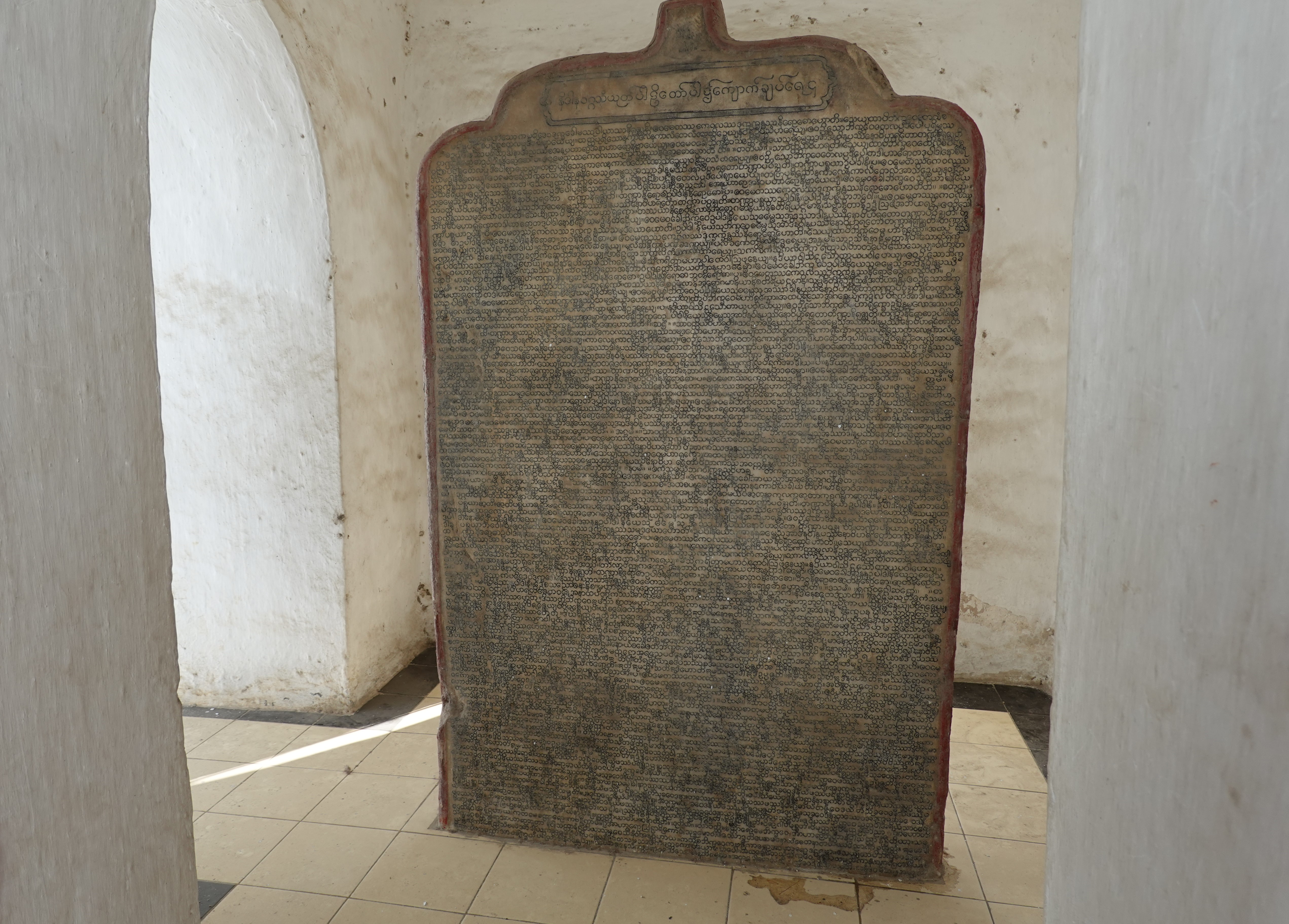
One of the stone inscriptions, originally in gold letters and borders, at Kuthodaw

In 1871, King Mindon was responsible for the construction in Mandalay of the world's largest book, consisting of 729 large marble tablets with the Tipitaka Pali canon of Theravada Buddhism inscribed on them in gold. One more was added to record how it all came about, making it 730 stone inscriptions in total. Stone tablets inscribed with the Tripiṭaka (and other Buddhist texts) stand upright in the grounds of the Kuthodaw Pagoda (kuthodaw means 'royal merit') at the foot of Mandalay Hill in Mandalay, Myanmar (Burma). The work was commissioned by King Mindon as part of his transformation of Mandalay into a royal capital. It was completed in 1878. The text contains the Buddhist canon in the Burmese language.

There are 730 tablets and 1,460 pages. Each page is 1.07 metres (3+^{1}/_{2} ft) wide, 1.53 metres (5 ft) tall and 13 centimetres (5+^{1}/_{8} in) thick. Each stone tablet has its own roof and precious gem on top in a small cave-like structure of Sinhalese relic casket type called kyauksa gu (stone inscription cave in Burmese), and they are arranged around a central golden pagoda.

Maha Lawkamarazein or Kuthodaw Inscription Shrines, the Stone Inscription is a collection of 729 stone slabs on which are inscribed the whole of the Buddhist scriptures whose religious and social significance is important to the world . It records the Fifth Great Synod convened by King Mindon and which was the significant event of the Buddhist religion and its devotees. In 2013, The United Nations Educational, Scientific and Cultural Organization UNESCO added the Kuthodaw Inscription Shrines (also known as the Maha Lawkamarazein) at Kuthodaw Pagoda to the Memory of the World International Register.

The 730 marble tablets at Kuthodaw Pagoda represent a monumental achievement in the preservation of the Pali Canon. Commissioned by King Mindon during the Fifth Buddhist Council in 1871, these marble slabs were meticulously inscribed to ensure the Tipitaka remained incorruptible by time or nature. Because of their unparalleled accuracy and permanence, they served as the primary official reference for the scholars of the Sixth Buddhist Council (1954–1956) in Yangon, anchoring the modern version of the Theravada scriptures in a solid, lithic tradition.

The Sixth Buddhist Council (1954–1956) held in Yangon to commemorate the 2,500th anniversary of the Buddha’s Parinirvana, this international council used the Fifth Council's stone inscriptions as a primary official reference. Thousands of monks from various Theravada nations cross-checked the stone texts against other regional versions to produce a definitive, purified edition of the Pali Canon.

== See also ==
- Buddhist councils
  - First Buddhist council
  - Second Buddhist council
  - Third Buddhist council
  - Fourth Buddhist council
  - Sixth Buddhist council
- Pāli Canon
  - Sutta Pitaka
  - Vinaya Pitaka
  - Abhidhamma Pitaka
- Tripiṭaka tablets at Kuthodaw Pagoda
