= Zayat =

Type of Burmese pavilion

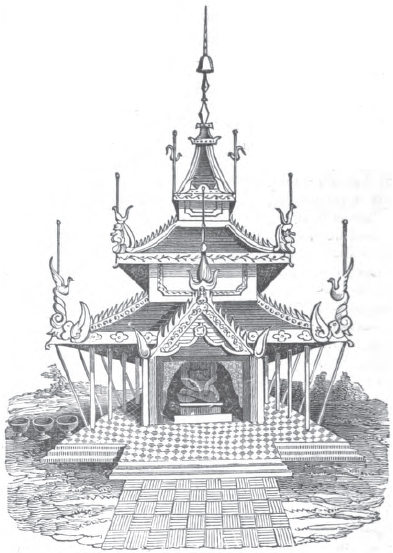
Illustration of a traditional Burmese zayat

A zayat (Burmese: ဇရပ်, MLCTS: ja. rap; IPA: [zəjaʔ]; from Mon: ဇြပ်) is a Burmese building found in almost every village. It serves primarily as a shelter for travelers, at the same time, is also an assembly place for religious occasions as well as meeting for the villagers to discuss the needs and plans of the village. Theravada Buddhist monks use zayats as their dwelling place while they are exercising precepts on Uposatha days. Buddhist monasteries may have one or more zayats nearby. Donors mostly build Zayats along main roads aiming to provide the exhausted travelers with water and shelter. Beginning with Adoniram Judson's construction of one in 1818 Christian missionaries have also adopted their use.

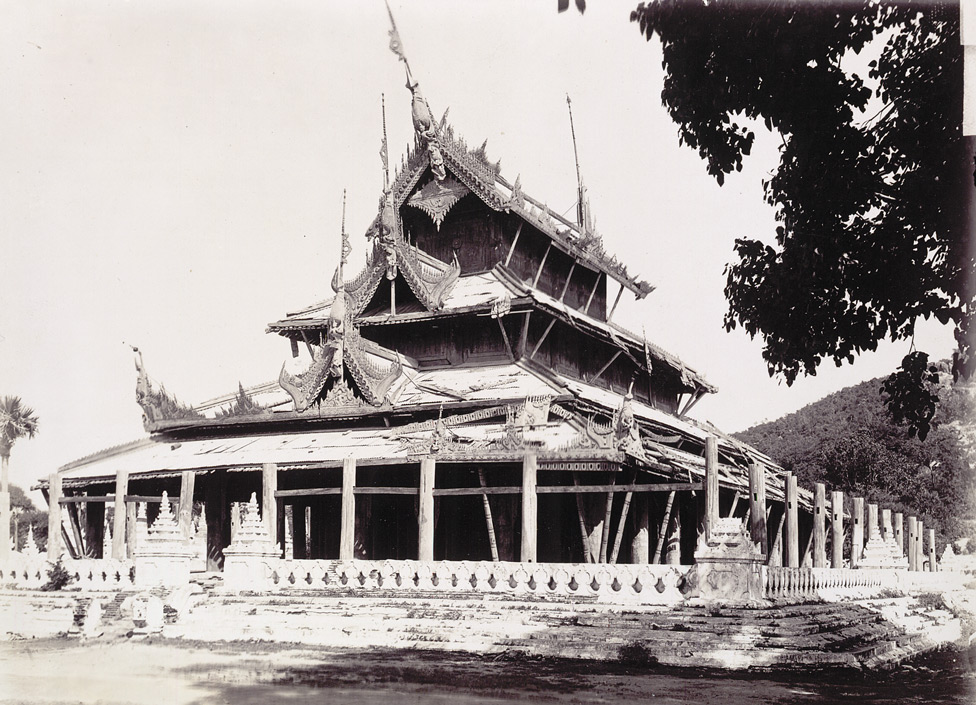
The Thudamma Zayat in Mandalay was built during the Konbaung Dynasty.

Contributions, in money or labor, towards the construction, running or elaboration of a zayat are seen as dāna (meritorious charity). Thus zayats are generally built in a more durable and costly manner than most private houses. The labor is normally provided by locals, while the financing may be local or remote.

Some zayats have evolved other functions over time. For example, the Jivitadana Sangha Hospital for Buddhist monks and nuns began as a clinic at a zayat.

== Literature in English ==
Because of the importance of zayat based evangelism to Adoniram Judson's mission, and the prominence that his first wife Ann Hasseltine's letters gave his work, many Christian missionaries in Burma constructed and used one or more zayats, and their letters and journals were widely published by missionary boards and societies in the United States.

The first Fu Manchu story entitled The Zayat Kiss was published as a stand-alone magazine story in 1912. This and the next nine stories were combined into the novel The Mystery of Dr. Fu Manchu in 1913, which was titled The Insidious Dr. Fu Manchu when published four months later in the United States.

== Gallery ==
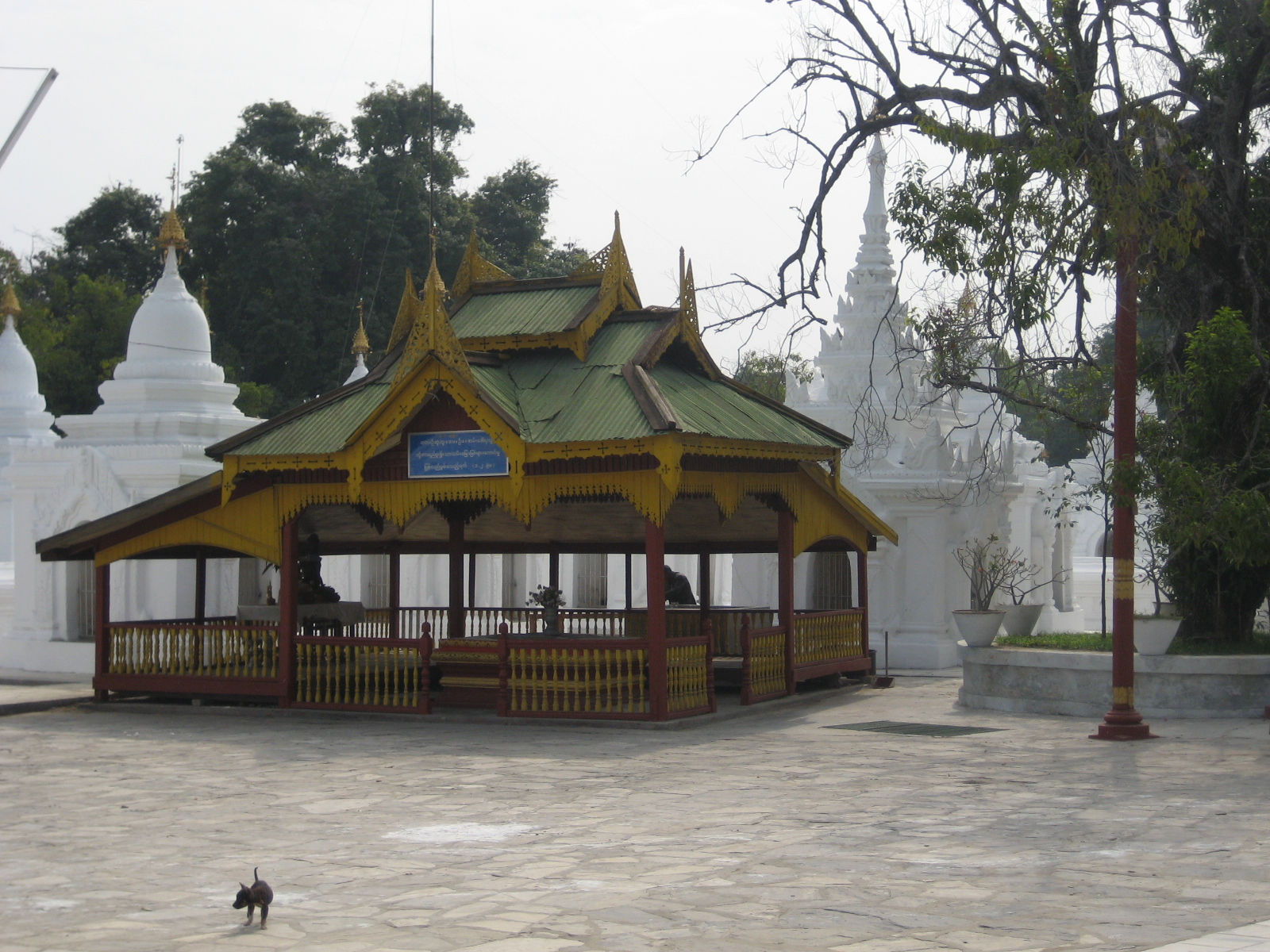
A Zayat (pavilion) at Kuthodaw Pagoda, Mandalay, Burma

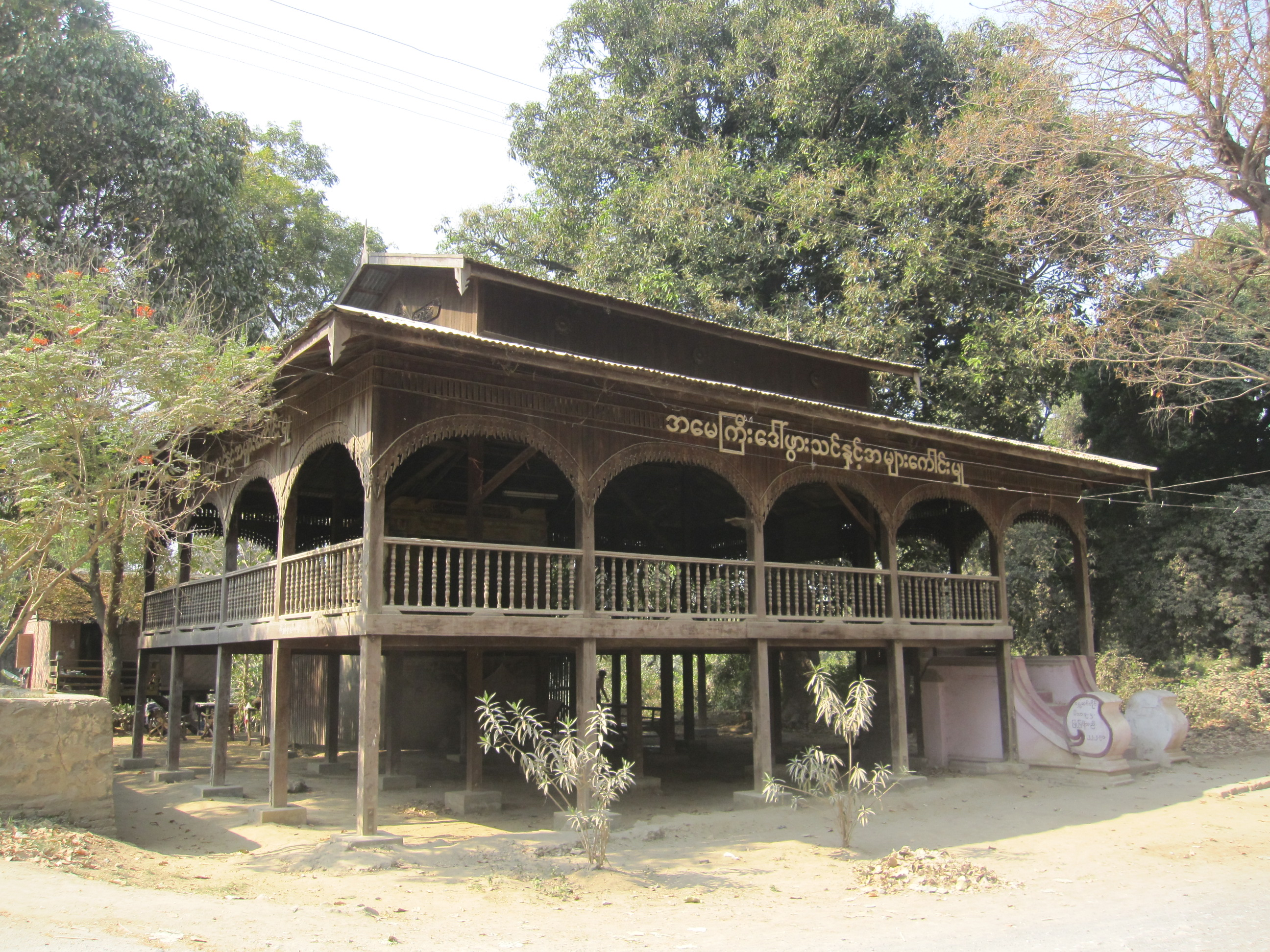
A roadside Zayat (rest house) at Amarapura, Burma

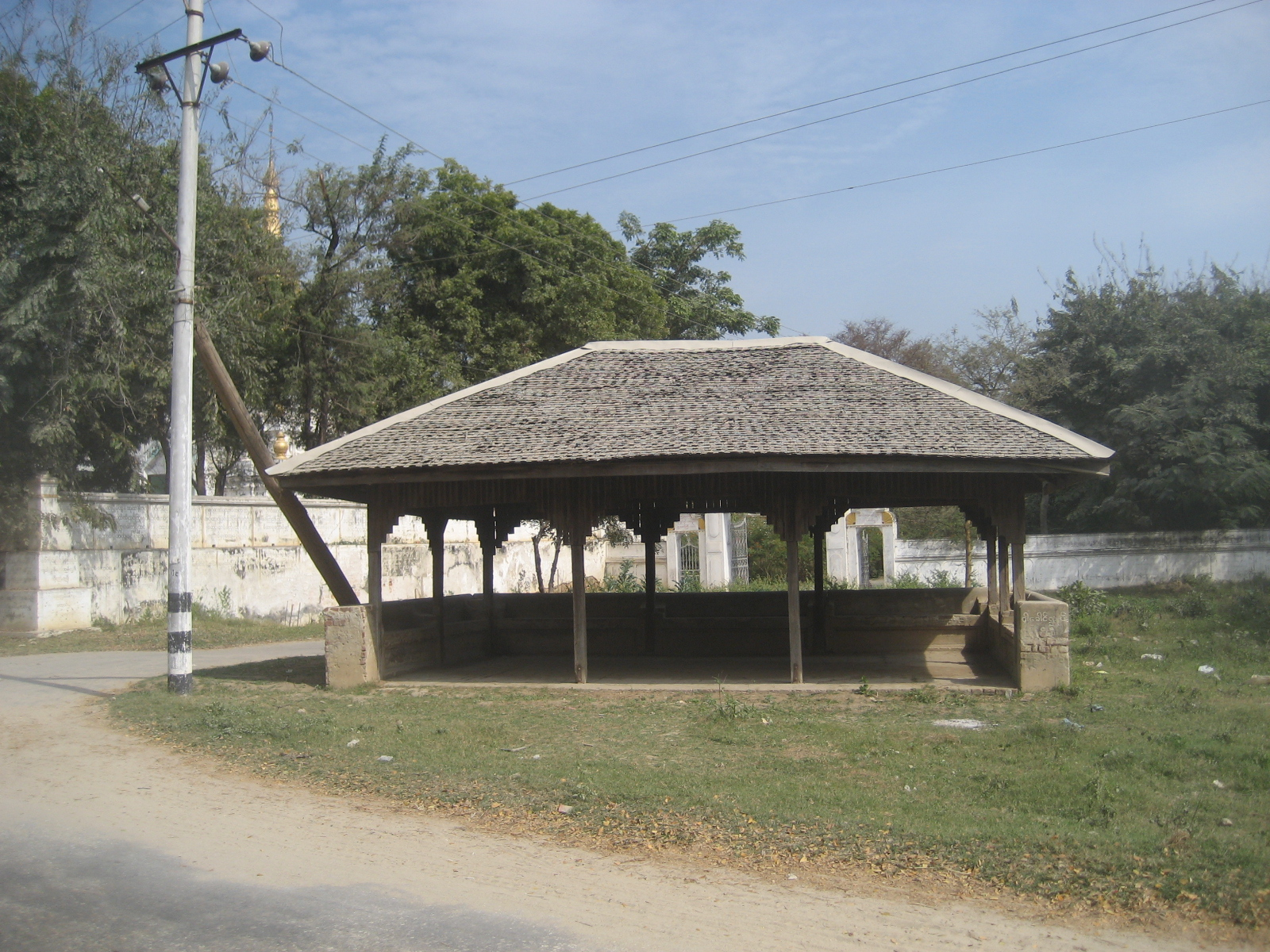
A Zayat at Sagaing, Burma

== See also ==
- Awgatha
- Burmese pagoda
- Kyaung
- Sala kan parian
- Sala (architecture)
