= Kyaymyin Mibaya =

Queen of the fourth rank during the Burmese Konbaung dynasty

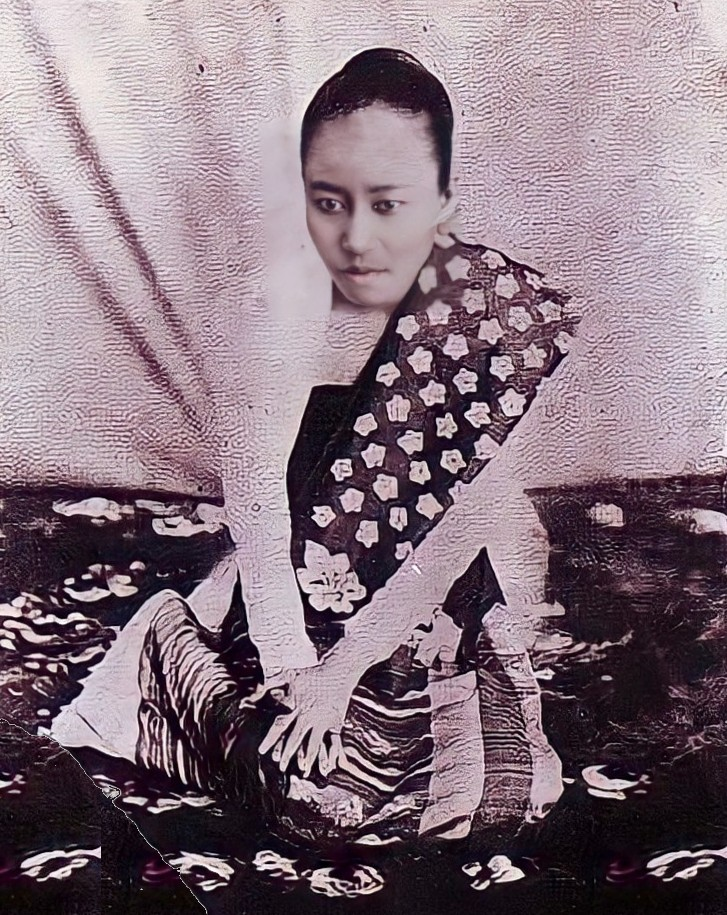
- Kyaymyin Mibaya

Mibaya of Kyaymyin
- Tenure: ? — 1 October 1878
- Born: Ma Ma Khin c. 1852 (Note: (Colbeck 1892: 81) says the queen was 35 when he met her on 30 May 1886. However, it does not state how he learned the age of the queen--e.g., by deriving from her birth date, or by asking her how old she was. In traditional Burmese age reckoning, the age of 35 means one's 35th year, or 34 years old in Western reckoning.); Yenangyaung, Burma
- Died: 1923 (aged 70–71); British Burma
- Spouse: Mindon Min
- Issue: Pyinmana Prince
Regnal name
- Thu Thiri Paba Mahe
- House: Konbaung (by marriage)
- Father: U So
- Mother: Daw Cho
- Religion: Buddhism

Kyaymyin Mibaya (Burmese: ကြေးမြှင် မိဖုရား; c. 1852 – 1923) was a queen of the fourth rank of King Mindon of the Konbaung dynasty of Myanmar (Burma). She was the youngest, last and richest queen of King Mindon, who had 45 queens in total. She was one of the queens of the Royal Treasury (ရွှေတိုက်စာရင်းဝင် မိဖုရား).

== Life ==
The future queen was born into the yenan-twin yo (ရေနံတွင်းရိုး) noble family line that held the royal grant to exploit the oil wells in Burma. The family held a document, the "Nawarat Yaung-zon Kyan" (နဝရတ်ရောင်စုံကျမ်း), that recounted their lineage back over 500 years to the Pagan period. She was a daughter of Thado Mingyi Maha Minhla Mingaung U So, who was the Minister of Horse Affairs and Duke of Yenangyaung, and Wunkadaw Daw Cho. During the reign of King Mindon, she was promoted to the rank of queen while serving as a senior lady-in-waiting of the Glass Palace (မှန်နန်း အပျိုတော်ကြီး). Because he was interested in marrying into a yenan-twin yo family, the king decided to raise Kyaymyin to a fourth-rank queen. She received Kyaymyin circle as her appanage. Kyaymyin gave birth to a son who was named Pyinmana Prince. King Mindon ordered the Minister of Yenangyaung to give oil wells to his son as a goodwill present. Kyaymyin and her son escaped the palace massacre in which over 100 members of the royal family were murdered on the order of Hsinbyumashin.

After the fall of the Konbaung dynasty, the British government moved Kyaymyin and her son out of the Mandalay Palace in February 1886. Because the queen's oil business was earning between 6,000 and 10,000 kyats a month, she was the wealthiest of King Mindon's queens. She owned 1,000 acres of land. She built a large mansion worth more than 100,000 kyats in Mandalay (that was destroyed by bombing during World War II). She also renovated the Kyaymyin Monastery, originally built by the village head of Yandabo in 1878. She also donated to the Nghet-Twin Gyaung Monastery (ပထမ ငှက်တွင်းချောင်) in Sagaing. The British government confiscated 120 boreholes owned by King Mindon and Kyaymyin Mibaya and leased them to Burmah Oil. Kyaymyin died in 1923 at the age of 73.

== See also ==
- Konbaung dynasty
- List of Burmese consorts
