= Kyaymyin Monastery =

Buddhist monastery in Mandalay, Myanmar

- ကြေးမြင့်ကျောင်း
- Location within Myanmar

Religion
- Affiliation: Theravada Buddhism

Location
- Country: Mandalay, Mandalay Region, Burma
- Interactive map of Kyaymyin Monastery
- Coordinates: 21.984174°N 96.114180°E

Architecture
- Completed: 1878; 148 years ago

Kyaymyin Monastery (Burmese: ကြေးမြင့်ကျောင်း), also known as the Yandabo Ywaza Monastery (Burmese: ရန္တပိုရွာစားကျောင်း) is a historic royal Buddhist monastery in Mandalay, Burma. The monastery, located on 62nd Street, was originally established by the village chief of Yandabo, in 1878. It was subsequently renovated by Kyaymyin Mibaya, a minor consort of King Mindon Min. The monastery’s roof is three-tiered and engraving works on the entrance stairs are impressively featured.

== See also ==
- Kyaung
