= Mandalay Palace =

Royal palace of the last Burmese monarchy

- မန္တလေး နန်းတော်
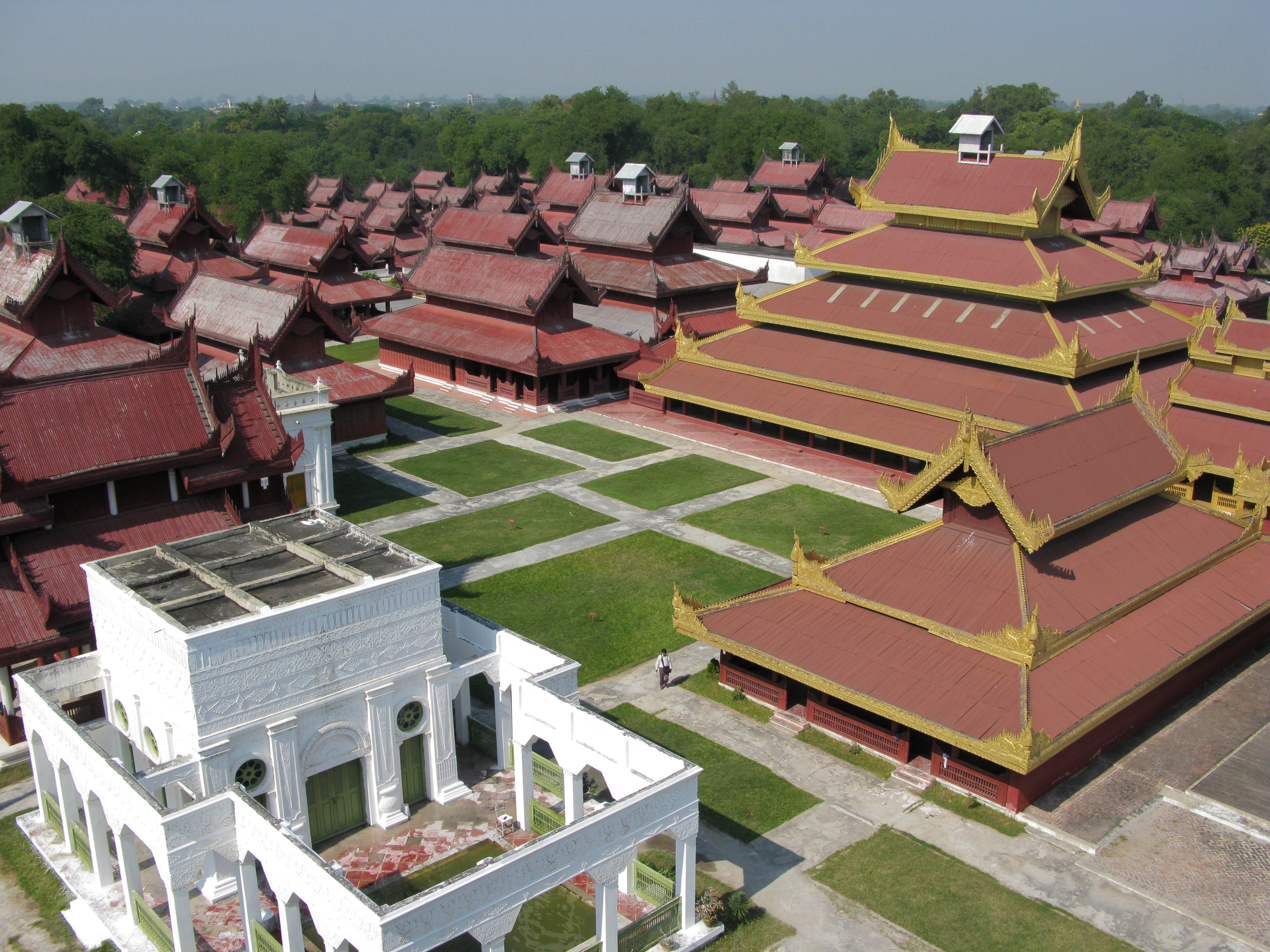
- Mandalay Palace grounds

- Location within Myanmar
- Alternative names: Mya Nan San Kyaw Golden Palace

General information
- Type: Official Residence of the King of Konbaung Dynasty
- Architectural style: Burmese
- Location: Mandalay, Myanmar
- Coordinates: 21°59′34.59″N 96°5′45.28″E
- Construction started: 1857 (original); 1989 (reconstruction)
- Completed: 1859 (original); 1991 (reconstruction)
- Owner: Government of Myanmar

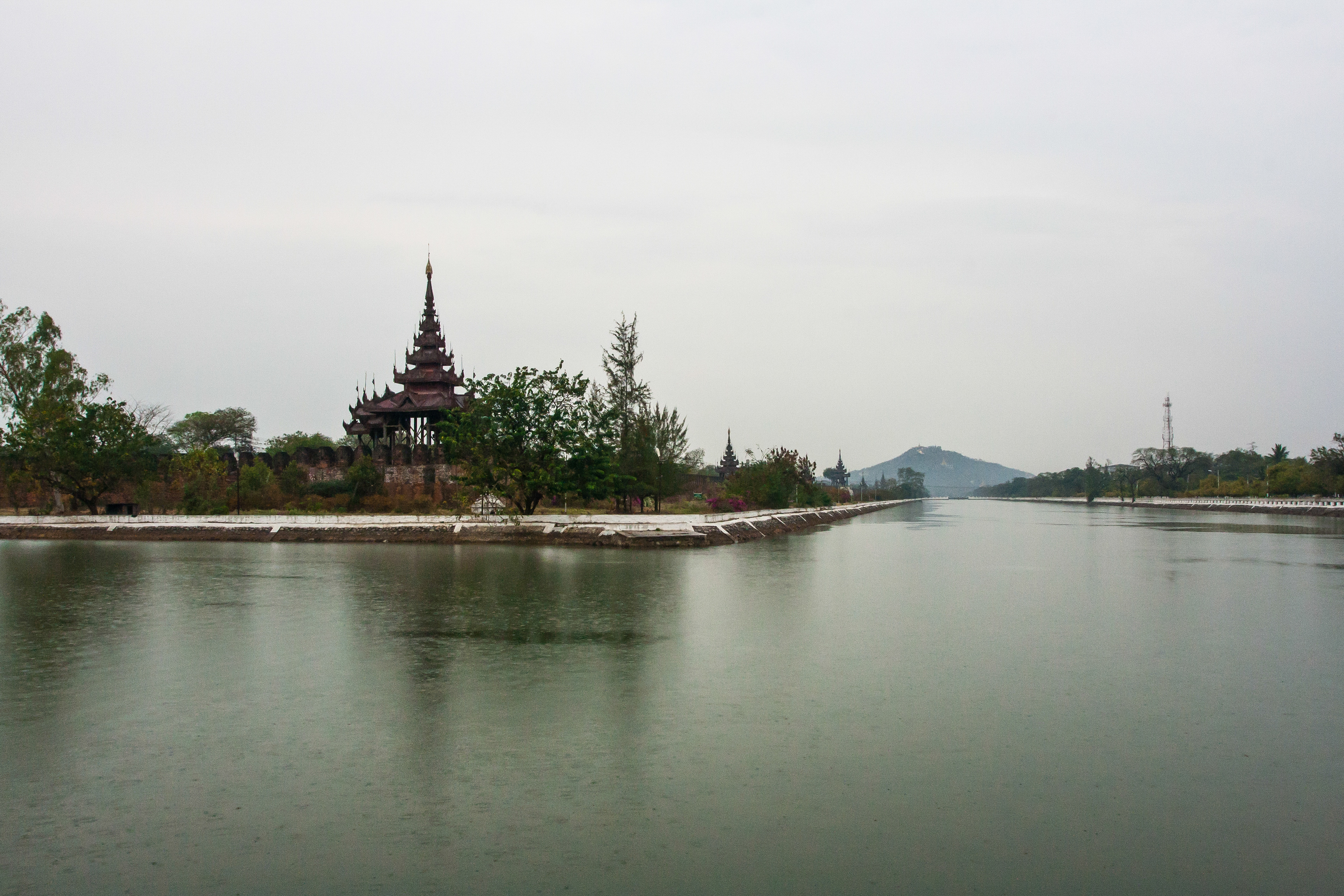
Palace wall on the moat with Mandalay Hill in the distance

The Mandalay Palace (Burmese: မန္တလေး နန်းတော်, pronounced [máɰ̃dəlé náɰ̃dɔ̀]), located in Mandalay, Myanmar, is the last royal palace of the last Burmese monarchy. The palace was constructed between 1857 and 1859 as part of King Mindon's founding of the new royal capital city of Mandalay. The plan of Mandalay Palace largely follows the traditional Burmese palace design; it is inside a walled fort surrounded by a moat. The palace itself is at the centre of the citadel and faces east. All buildings of the palace are of one storey in height. The number of spires above a building indicated the importance of the area below.

Mandalay Palace was the primary royal residence of King Mindon and King Thibaw, the last two kings of the country. The complex ceased to be a royal residence and seat of government on 28 November 1885 when, during the Third Anglo-Burmese War, troops of the Burma Field Force entered the palace and captured the royal family. The British turned the palace compound into Fort Dufferin, named after the then viceroy of India. Throughout the British colonial era, the palace was seen by the Burmese as the primary symbol of sovereignty and identity. Much of the palace compound was destroyed during World War II by allied bombing; only the royal mint and the watch tower survived. A replica of the palace was rebuilt in the 1990s with some modern materials.

Mandalay Palace is a primary symbol of Mandalay and a major tourist destination.

On 28 March 2025, the 2025 Myanmar earthquake damaged parts of the Palace.

== Names ==
The Mandalay Palace's formal name in Burmese is Mya Nan San Kyaw (မြနန်းစံကျော် [mja̰ nán sàn tɕɔ̀]; "The Famed Royal Emerald Palace"). It is also known as ရွှေနန်းတော်ကြီး ([ʃwè nán dɔ̀ dʑí]), or the "Great Golden Royal Palace".

== History ==
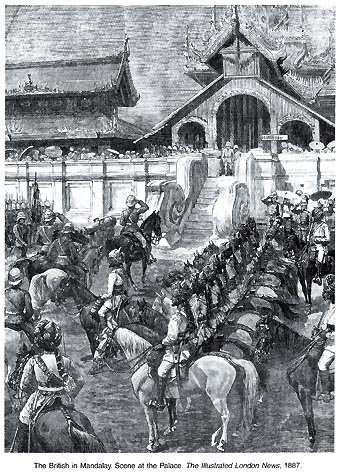
British colonial forces in Mandalay Palace, which they subsequently ransacked (1887)

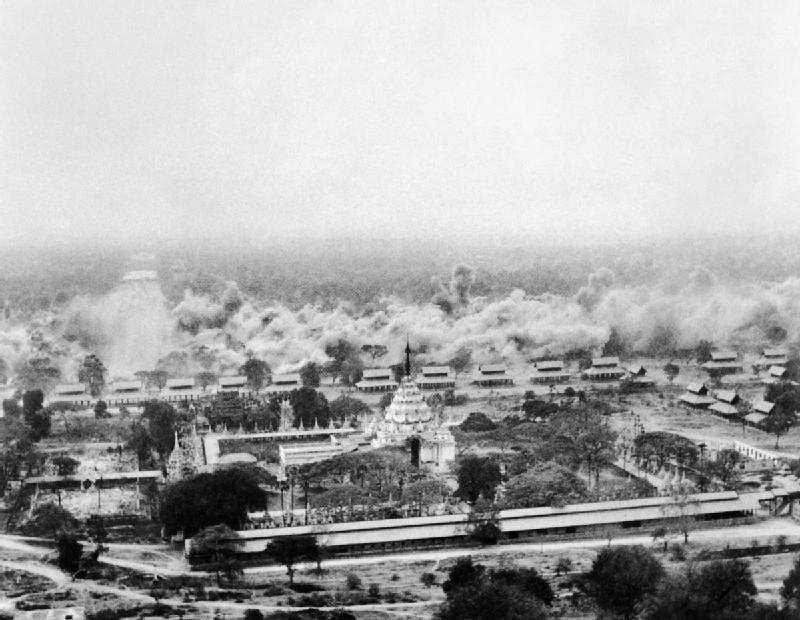
Fort Dufferin under aerial attack during World War II

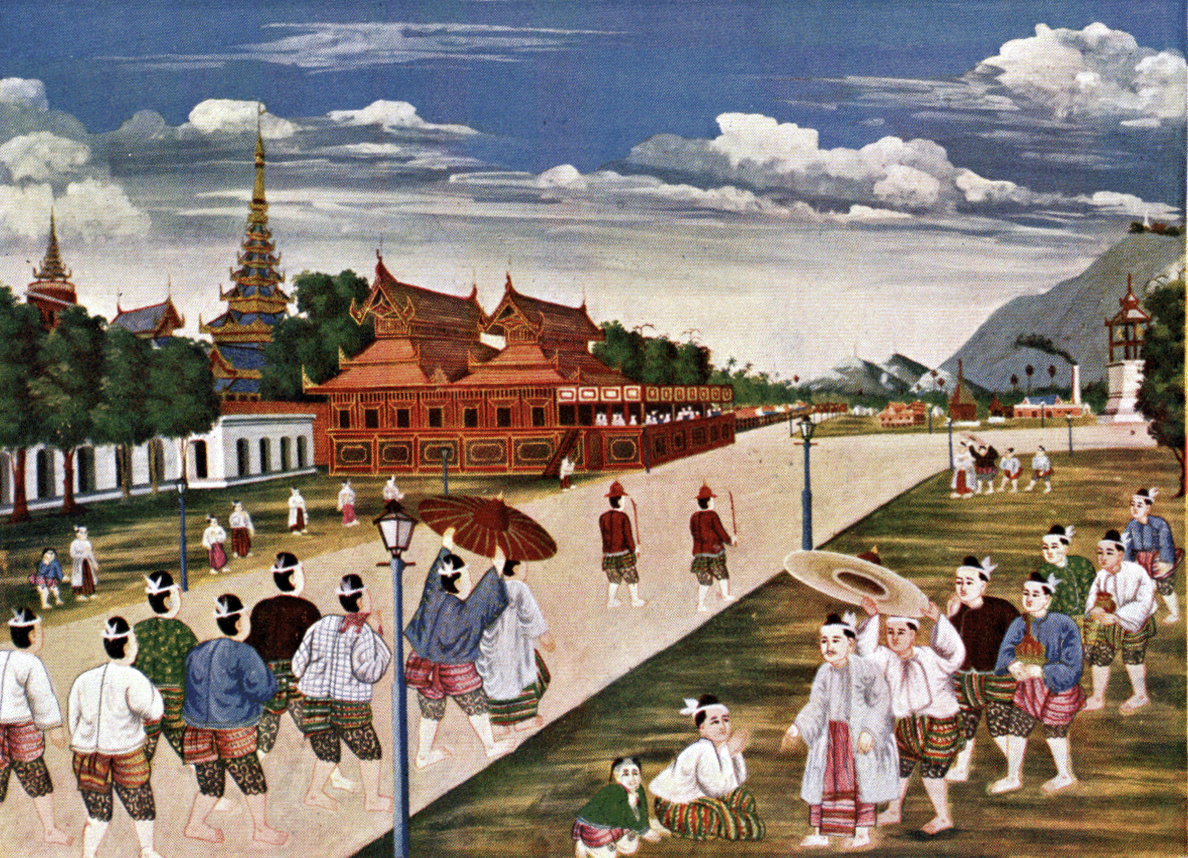
A traditional Burmese painting of Mandalay Palace grounds during the Konbaung dynasty

The Mandalay Palace was constructed as part of King Mindon's founding of Mandalay in February 1857. Large parts of the palace were reconstructed from the palace at Amarapura, which was relocated to Mandalay. The master plan called for a 144-square block grid patterned city, anchored by a 16 square block royal palace compound at the centre by Mandalay Hill. The 413-hectare royal palace compound was surrounded by four 2 km (6666 ft) long walls and a moat 64 m (210 ft) wide, 4.5 m (15 ft) deep. Along the wall were bastions with gold-tipped spires at intervals of 169 m (555 ft). The walls had three gates on each side, twelve in total, each presenting a zodiac sign. The citadel had five bridges to cross the moat.

In June 1857, the construction of the palace began. After the disastrous Second Anglo-Burmese War of 1852, the shrunken Burmese kingdom had few resources to build a new ostentatious palace. The former royal palace of Amarapura was dismantled and moved by elephants to the new location at the foot of Mandalay Hill. The construction of the palace compound was officially completed on Monday, 23 May 1859.

During the Third Anglo-Burmese War, the British captured and occupied the palace, ransacking it before burning down the royal library. The royal regalia of Burma were removed as spoils of war and displayed in the South Kensington Museum (now the V&A Museum, London). In 1964 they were returned to Burma as a gesture of goodwill. The British renamed the palace compound Fort Dufferin and used it to billet troops. During World War II, the palace citadel was turned into a supply depot by the Japanese and was burnt to the ground by Allied bombing. Only the royal mint and the watch tower survived.

=== 1989–present: Reconstruction and conservation ===
Reconstruction of the palace began in 1989, initiated by the Department of Archaeology. Because government funds were insufficient, the Mandalay Committee for the palace Reconstruction was formed, with funds coming from the State Law and Order Restoration Council, which patronized this project. The regional governments of Mandalay, Magwe and Sagaing Divisions were responsible for drawing up architectural plans and constructing various parts of the palace:

- Mandalay Division: Great Audience Hall, the Lion Throne
- Magwe Division: Watchtower, Lily Throne Room
- Sagaing Division; Goose Throne Room

While the overall design was faithful, the construction process incorporated both traditional and modern building techniques. Corrugated sheet metal was used for the roofing of most buildings, while concrete was extensively used as a building material (the original palace was built using only teak).

One of the halls was dismantled during the rule of King Thibaw and rebuilt as Shwenandaw Monastery. It is the single remaining major structure of the original wooden palace today.

In October 2021, in the aftermath of the 2021 Myanmar coup d'état, the State Administration Council began constructing a public recreation park adjacent to the historic walls of the Mandalay Palace in violation of the 2015 Law on the Preservation and Protection of Ancient Buildings, sparking criticism from local conservationists.

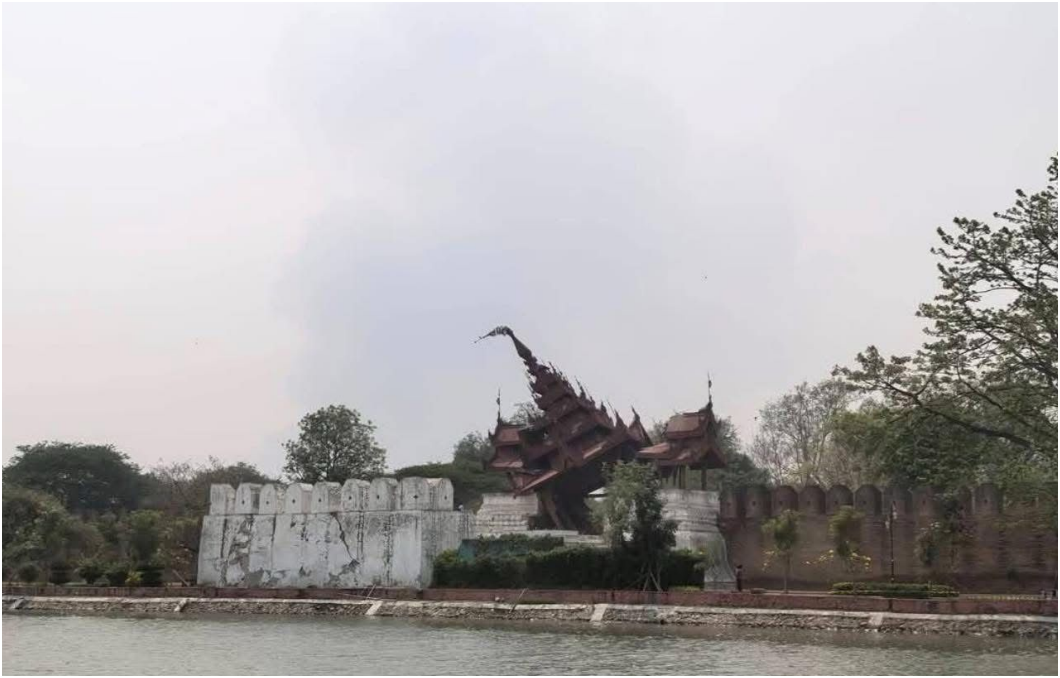
Damage to Mandalay Palace after the March 2025 earthquake

On 28 March 2025, a powerful earthquake hit Myanmar's Sagaing Region, damaging parts of Mandalay Palace. The destruction raised concerns among historians about the site's integrity. This is especially relevant given its contested status since 2021.

== Citadel ==
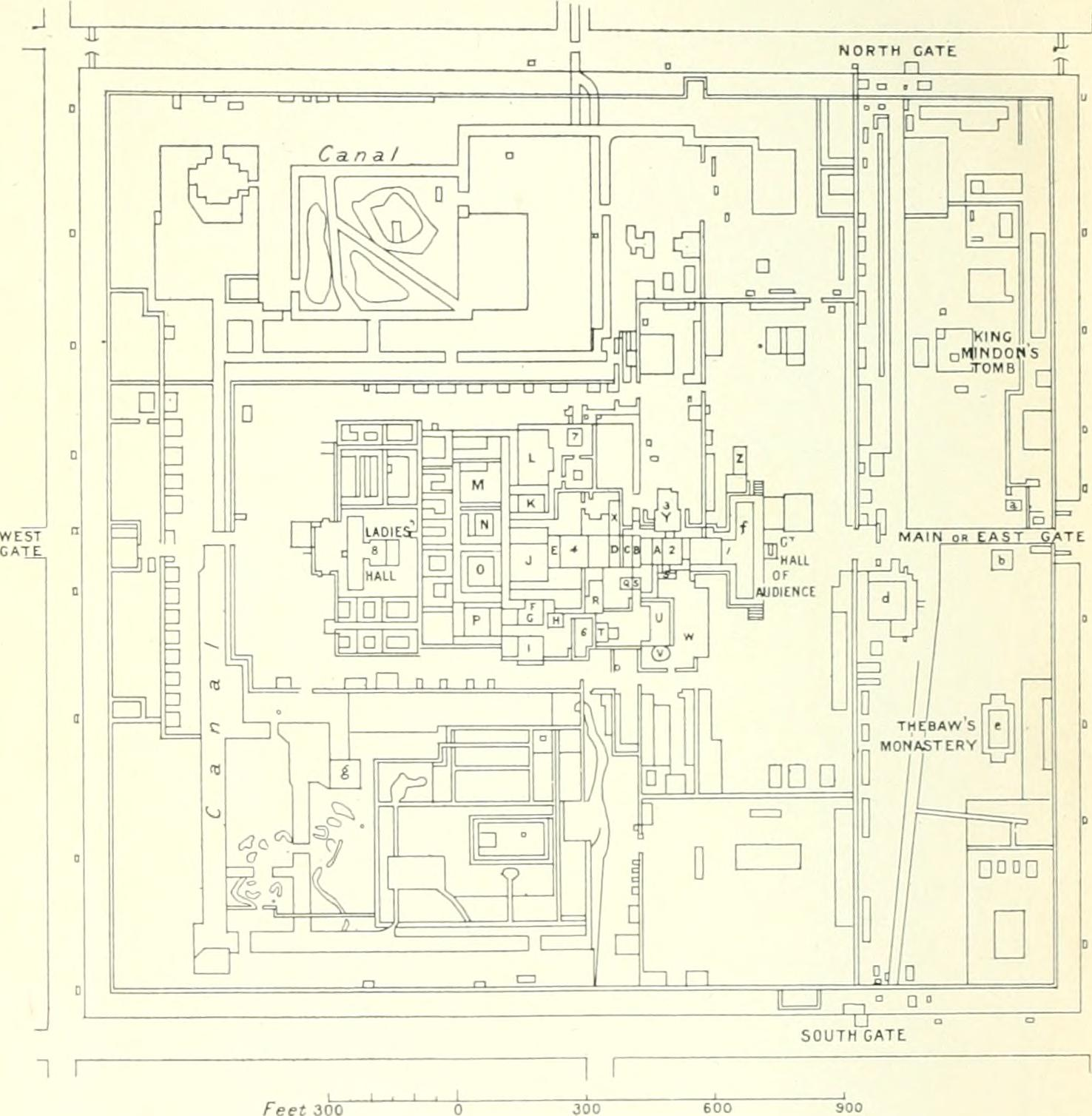
Plan of Mandalay Palace, 1911

=== The wall ===
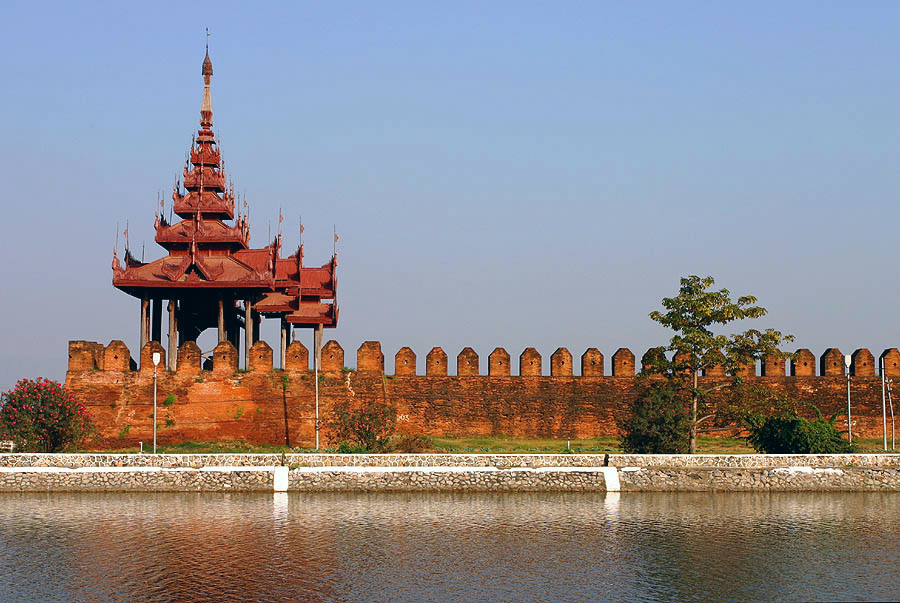
A bastion at the palace wall

The palace citadel's four 2 km long walls form a perfect square, complete with a total of 48 bastions with gold tipped pyatthats or spires at regular intervals of 169 m (555 ft) and surrounded by a moat 64 m (210 ft) wide, 4.5 m (15 ft) deep. The walls, built with the common Burmese bricks set in mud mortar, are 3 m (10 ft) thick at the base and 1.47 m (4 ft 10 in) at the top; 6.86 m (22.5 ft) in height, excluding the merlons, and 8.23 m (27 ft) with the merlons. The embrasures are 0.84 m (2 ft 9 in) in width. To give access to the battlements in cases of alert and at the same time to strengthen the wall, an earthen rampart on a moderately inclined plane has been thrown up behind it. Its summit forms a platform 1.83 m (2 ft) wide, paved with bricks and running all along the walls behind the crenelles.

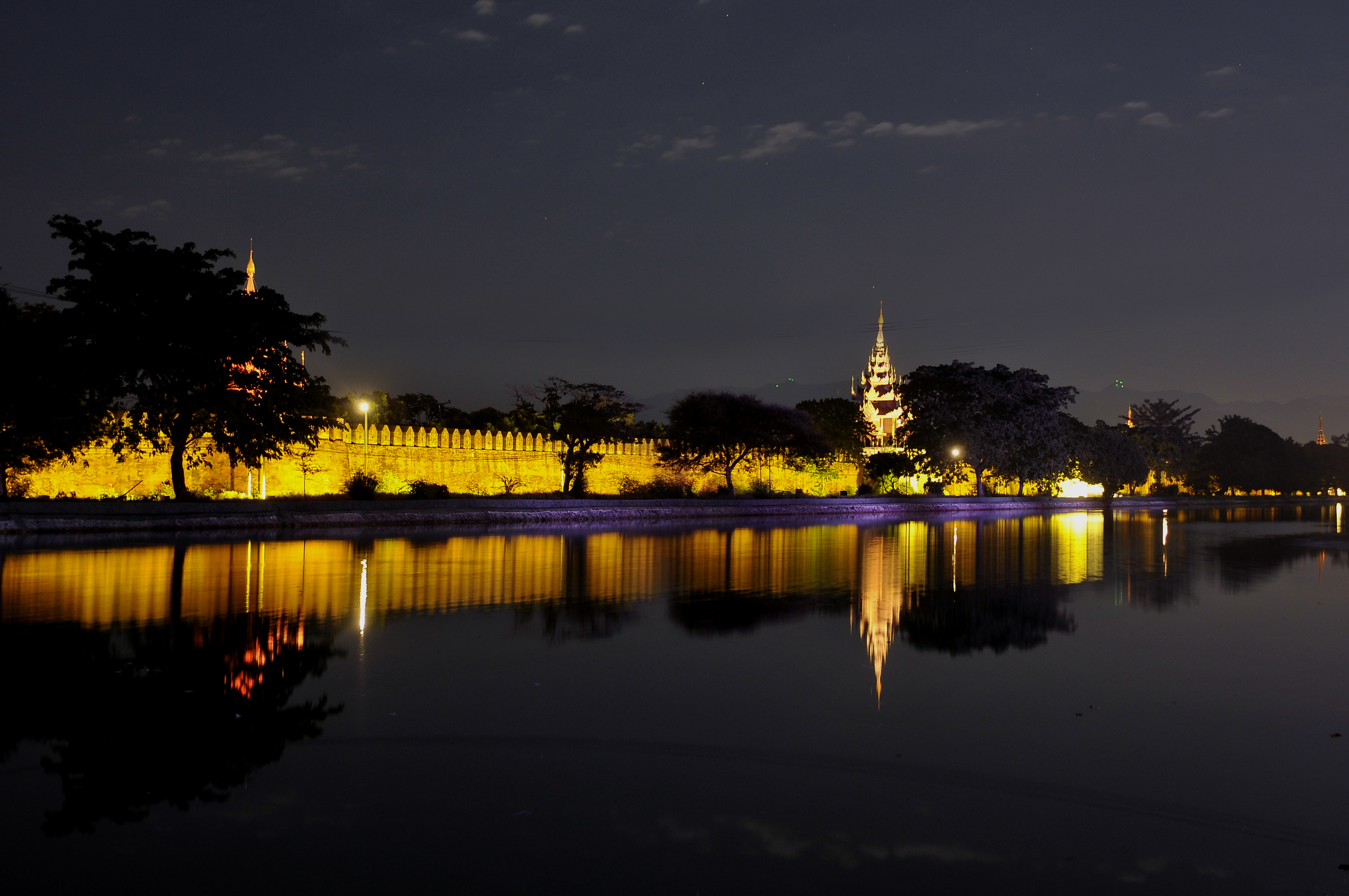
Palace wall at night

=== Gates ===
On each face of the walls are three gateways placed at equal distances (508 m; 1666.5 ft) one from the other and from the corners. Each of the twelve gates, represented by its own zodiac sign, is 4.8 m (15.75 ft) wide and flanked on both sides by one-half of a bastion which supports the post of a many-tiered pavilion or pyatthat that rises over the gateway. The pyatthats over middle gates, used by the royalty, have seven tiers while those on the rest have only five. Of these twelve gates, the main one was the central gate in the east wall, facing the Great Hall of Audience and the Lion Throne in the palace.

The bastion projects 7 m (23 ft) from the face of the wall, and is 10.36 m (34) ft in breadth on each side of the gateway. It is ornamented on the outside, with simple mouldings and simple plaster carvings, but on the inner face which forms the prolongation of the gateway itself, it rises abruptly without any plinth or mouldings, from the ground level. Two flights of steps, one on each side of the gateway, provide access to the top of the bastion and the wall. Each gateway was equipped with a thick wooden door of two leaves, (which were removed after the British annexation).

=== Masonry screens ===
The entrance to each gateway is protected by a masonry screen or barbican erected a few metres away from the moat in front of the entrance. It is 17.5 m (57 ft 5 in) in length, 5.2 m (17 ft) thick, 1.5 m (1 ft 8 in) in height, raised on a low plinth, and battering to the top. The summit is crowned by crenellated battlements on three sides only, the inner side facing the gate being left open and free. Access to the top could be gained by means of ladders, no other means of going up having been provided. It served as an advanced defence work protecting both the gate and the bridge a few feet away. By the side of this screen is a huge teak pillar resting on a brick plinth stepped off on two sides, and carrying near the top a wooden board on which is carved an inscription giving the name of the gate, and the year and date on which it was built.

Each of the four walls has 13 bastions for a total of 48 bastions. (Bastions at each corner are merged into one, hence 48 in total.) All the intermediate bastions are surmounted by a quintuple-roof pavilion. The barge-board of these many-gabled roofs are covered with carvings.

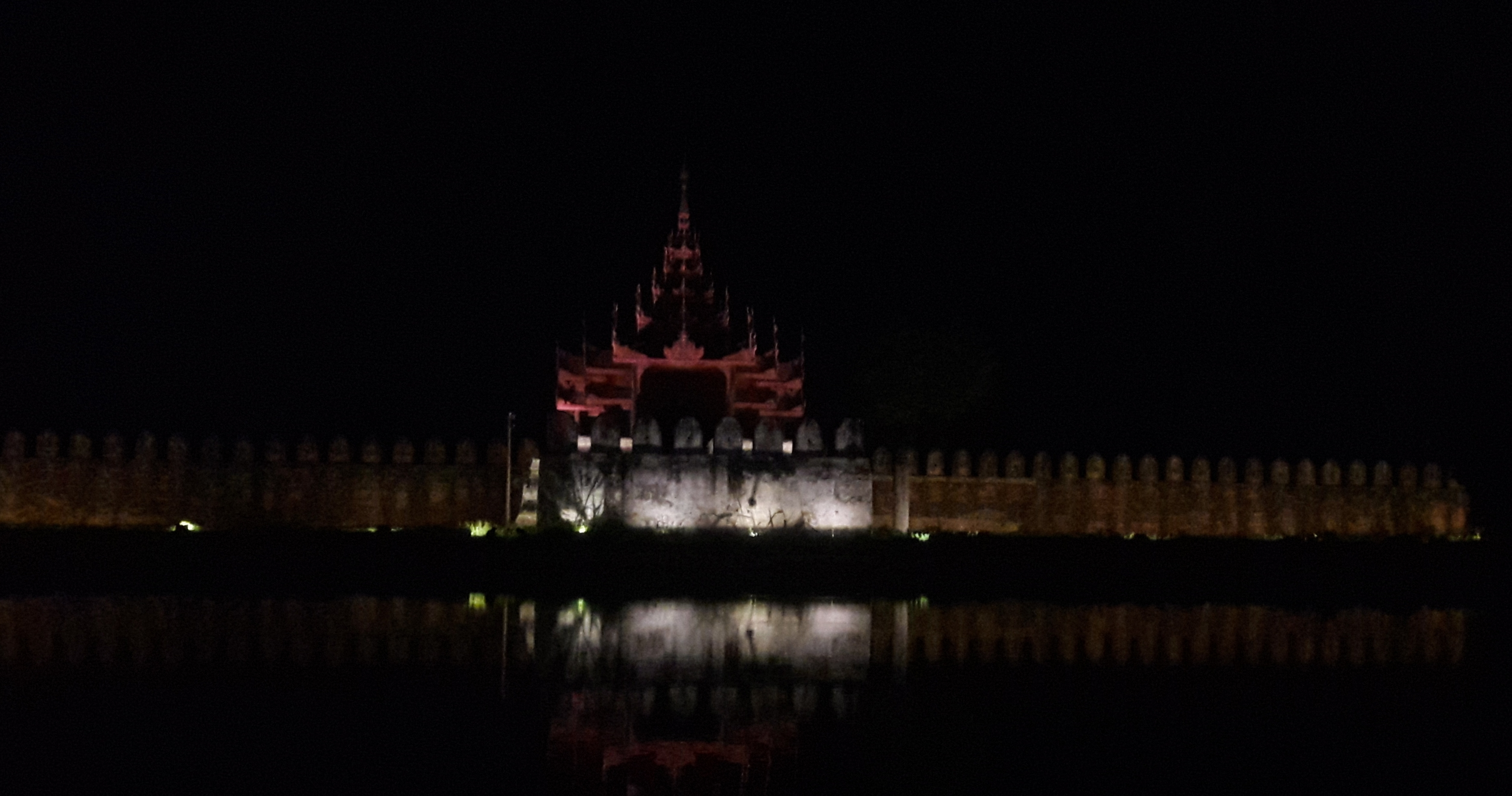
Masonry screens of Mandalay Palace at night

=== The moat ===
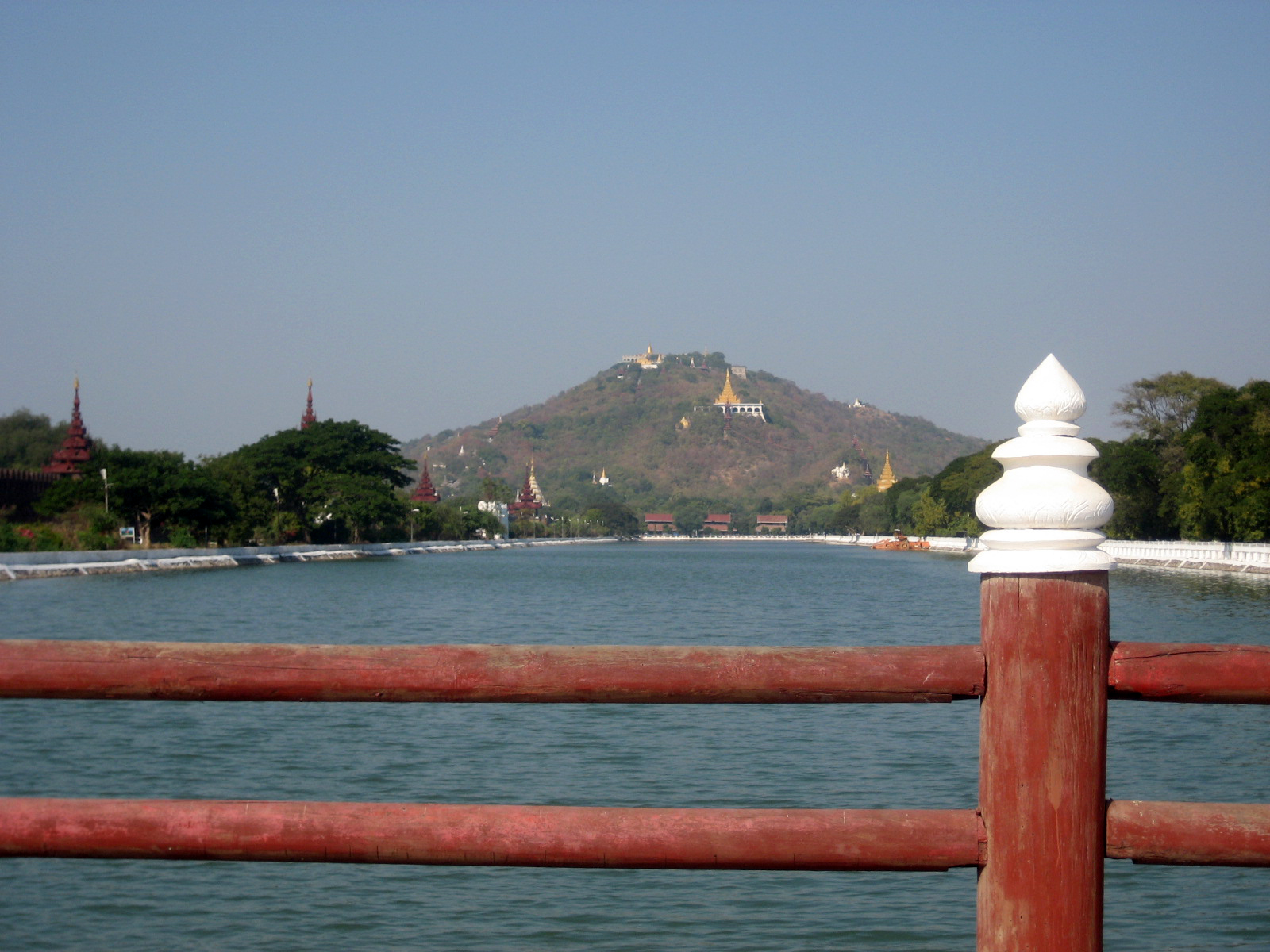
The moat seen from the East Gate Bridge with the Mandalay Hill in the background

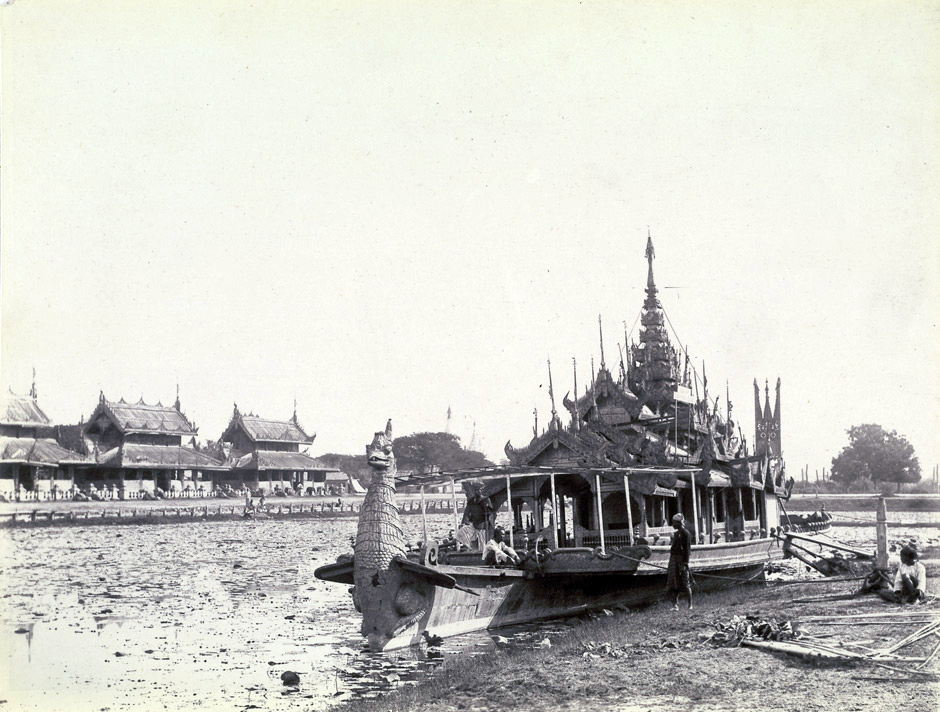
King Thibaw's royal barge on the Mandalay Palace moat in 1885

Surrounding the walls, at a distance of about 18 m (60 ft) from them, is a moat 64 m (210 ft) wide, and of an average depth of 4.5 m (15 ft). In the case of foes armed with ancient weapons, this moat would no doubt have presented a rather formidable obstacle to the besieging army, whose crafts would have been completely exposed to the missiles of the warriors protected by the merlons on the ramparts and on the barbicans.

The moat was originally spanned over by five wooden bridges, four of which lead to the four principal or middle gates, that is one to each face of the walls. The fifth leads up to the south-western gate, used during the times of monarchy for amingala or inauspicious occasions such as to carry off dead bodies. The British constructed two additional bridges one at the south-west and the other at the north-west corner, to allow of materials and supplies for the troops into the fort.

The five original bridges are similar in design and are in unison with the defensive character of the fort and the moat. Two earthen embankments encased within brick walls form the abutments running into the moat from both banks. The space between is spanned over by teak logs of natural size – the length of two of these logs making up the length of the bridge resting, at both extremities on transversal beams supported by five posts partially encased in the masonry of the abutments; the extremities of the logs which meet in the middle of the bridge are likewise supported by five huge wooden pillars the heads of which are joined together by means of two large wooden plates which rest on cleats so constructed that the whole structure could be taken down and removed rapidly in case of danger.

== Palace grounds ==
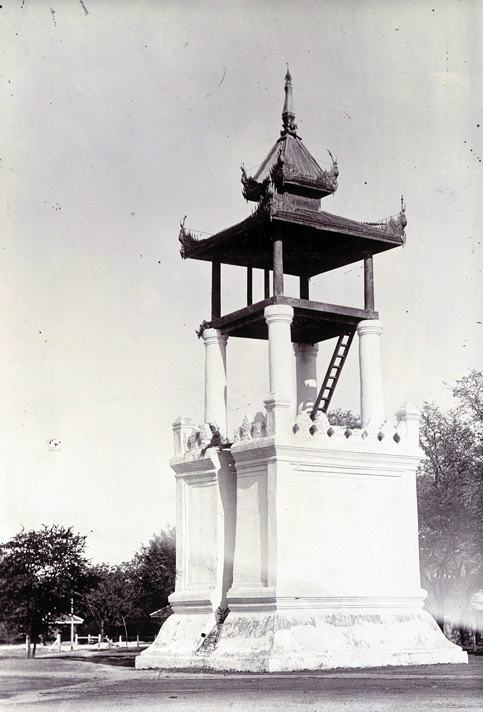
The clock tower, circa 1903

=== Clock Tower ===
Entering the palace grounds from the east, on the right or north sits the Clock Tower, or Bahozin (ပဟိုရ်စင်). It is a simple building, consisting of a high square plinth; on the top of this four columns sustain a wooden platform surmounted by a double-roof; the whole is crowned by a small finial and a hti or umbrella. It is from this platform that the passing of time was made known to the city by sounding regularly a gong and a very large drum at each watch, that is, every third hour; the day and the night were each divided into four watches. The time was marked by a water-clock. This consisted of a large water jar on the water of which was placed a brass bowl; in the bottom of the latter was pierced a tiny hole, its size so calculated that the bowl filled with water and dropped to the bottom of the jar at exact recurring intervals, which were the hours.

=== Relic Tower ===
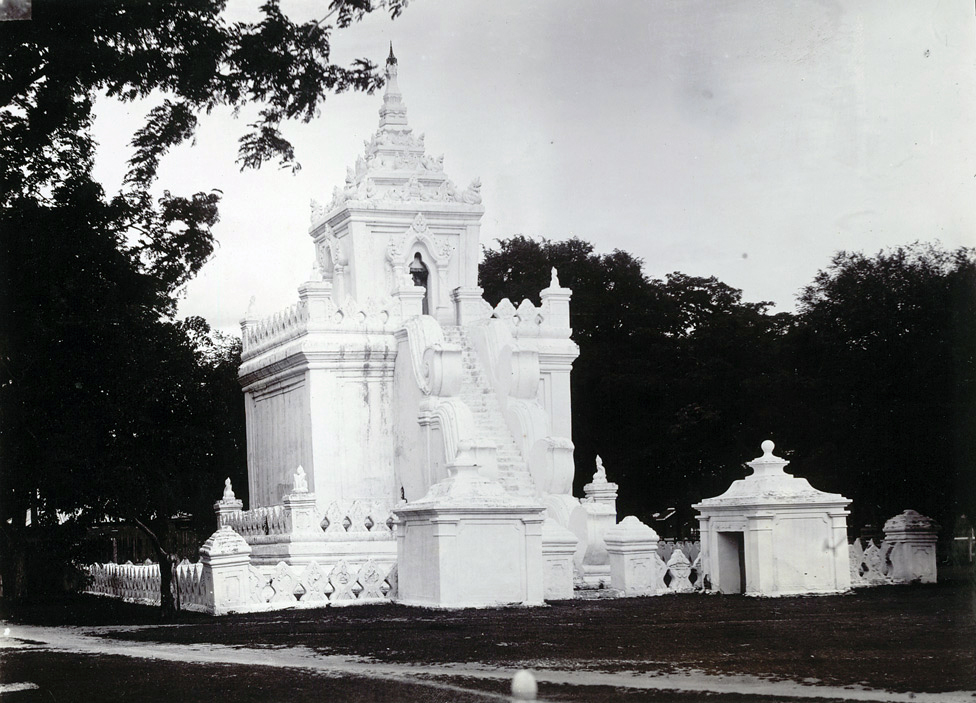
The Relic Tower, circa 1903

To the south of the Clock Tower, nearly facing it across the road is Swedawzin (စွယ်တော်စင်) or the Tooth-Relic Tower. A good example of traditional Burmese architecture, the Relic Tower has three parts – first a low basement; second a rectangular block or terrace rising from the first and third a relic-chamber surmounted by a three-tiered roof (pyatthat); the whole is crowned by the usual finial and the hti. Along the four sides of both basement and terrace runs a battlemented parapet formed of lozenge ornaments; at the four corners of each are small square pillars each surmounted by a marble manussiha or winged leogryph; the monster has a human head and two bodies.

The relic-chamber on the terrace is square; the only entrance into it is on the west, facing the flight of stairs by which access is obtained to the top of the terrace; these narrow steps are enclosed between two brick walls, ornamented with copings in three tiers; the lower end of each coping is terminated by a large and graceful volute; this kind of ornamental stairs, with minor differences in details, may be seen all over Burma, either in brick or wood. The walls and roofs of the relic-chamber are adorned with graceful plaster carvings.

Although the building is called the Tooth Relic Tower, there never was any tooth-relic enshrined in it. The tower was built simply because it was the tradition to have such a tower at the royal city, a tradition from the time of King Bayinnaung.

=== Hluttaw ===
The Hluttaw (လွှတ်တော်, [l̥ʊʔ tɔ̀]) or the Supreme Court was where the official business of the court was conducted. The Lion Throne (Sihasana) was the chief throne of eight in the palace. The hall consists of two three-roofed wooden structures, richly decorated with figures and flowers, and supported by massive teak pillars painted red at the bottom and gilded above. Therein was a Lion-Throne (Sihasana) for the king.

=== Royal mausoleums ===
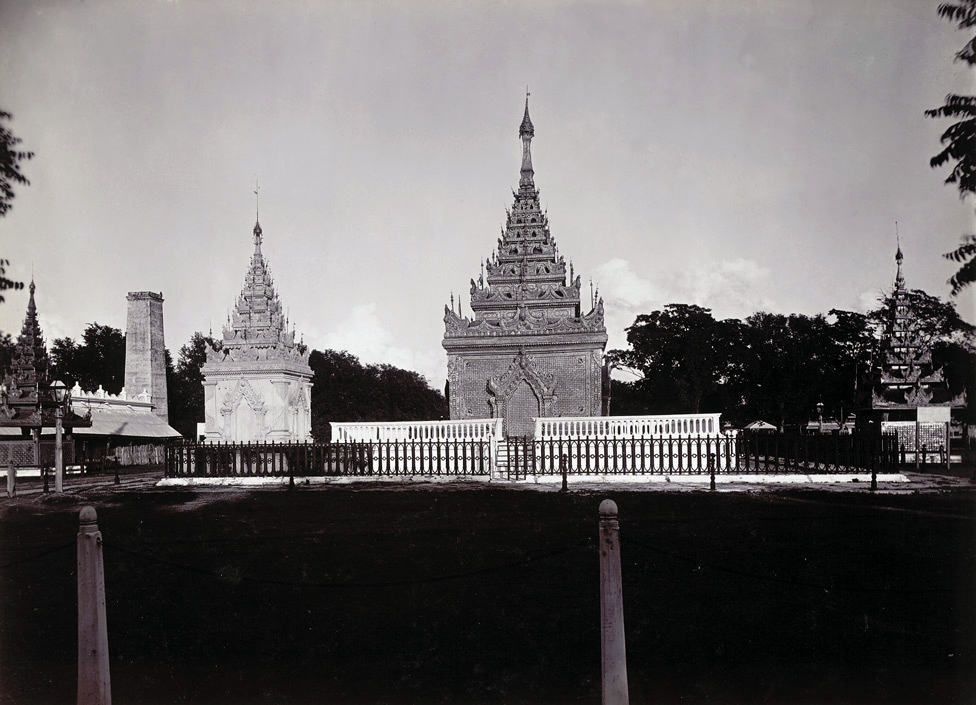
King Mindon's mausoleum, c. 1903

Due north from the Clock Tower is a cluster of mausoleums erected to the memory of some members of the royal family. The most important historically is that of King Mindon, who died in 1878. It was originally a brick pyatthat, plastered over and whitewashed, erected by King Thibaw to the memory of his father, as soon as the grave had been built. The Sawbwa of Yawnghwe, decorated the king's tomb with glass mosaic. It is a square structure surmounted by a septuple roof terminating as usual in a hti. Other mausoleums include those of three wives of Mindon: Chief Queen; Queen Laungshe, mother of King Thibaw; Queen Hsinbyumashin, mother of Queen Supayalat.

=== Royal Mint ===
The Royal Mint is located a few hundred metres to the northeast of the mausoleums. It was where the first Burmese coin was minted in 1865. After the British annexation, the mint was used as bakery for the troops for some years. It was one of few buildings in the palace that survived allied bombing during World War II.

=== Watch tower ===
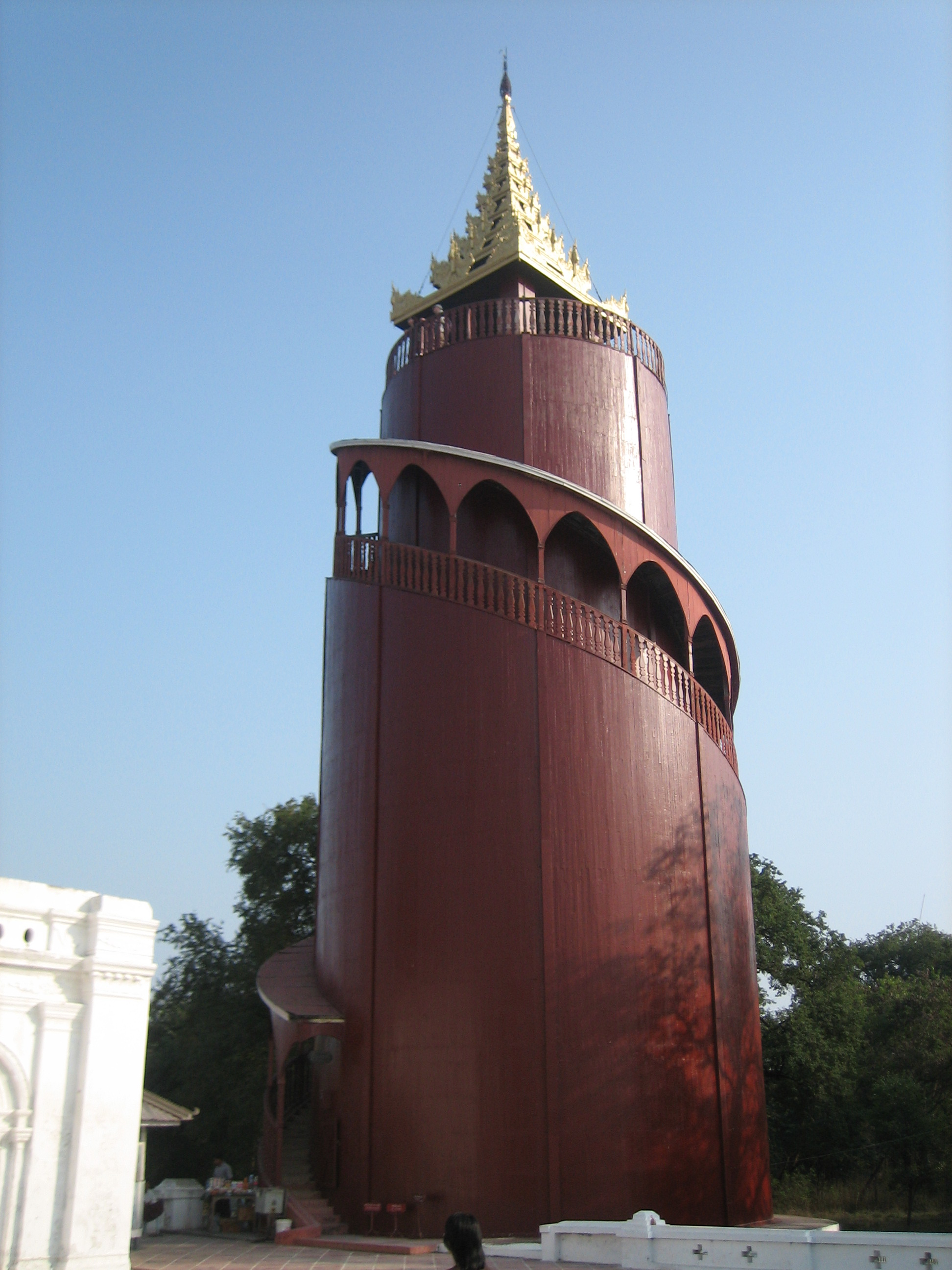
Mandalay Palace watch tower

The palace grounds are dominated by the 24 m (78 ft) tall Nanmyintsaung (နန်းမြင့်ဆောင်) or Watch Tower, topped by a seven tiered pyatthat. It was the spot from which to view the city. The king and queen sometimes ascended the tower to witness the panorama of the country around, with its river, the bills and lakes. They also, from its summit, contemplated the spectacle of the illumination of the town at the Thadingyut festival at the end of Vassa ('Buddhist Lent'). It is said that Queen Supayalat witnessed, from there, the entry of the British troops who took Mandalay in November 1885. The Watch Tower also survived the allied bombing during World War II.

== On the palace platform ==
The road from the Eastern Gate, which passes between the Clock Tower and the Relic Tower, leads to the Mye-Nandaw, and the Golden Spire over the Lion Throne Room, which marks the centre of the city. All the palace buildings stood on the platform. The latter consists of three distinct parts: on the east, the Great Audience Hall and the Lion Throne Room are erected on an earthen basement contained by a brick wall; the whole of the western portion, from the westernmost extremity up to and including the Hman-nan or Glass Palace, is likewise an earthen basement surrounded by a masonry wall; these two basements are connected, from the Hman-nan up to the Lion Throne Room, by a plank flooring of the same level supported by numerous teak posts. The whole of this platform, in its greatest length, measures 306 m (1,004 ft); in its greatest width, 175 m (574 ft). The height of the basement is 2 m (6 ft 9 in), the surrounding or retaining wall rising to a height of 3 m (10 ft 9 in) from the surrounding ground, and forming a parapet 1.2 m (4 ft) from the basement. Access to the top of the basement was obtained by thirty-one flights of steps, some large and some quite small, the principal of which are those at the eastern and western extremities.

=== Great Audience Hall ===
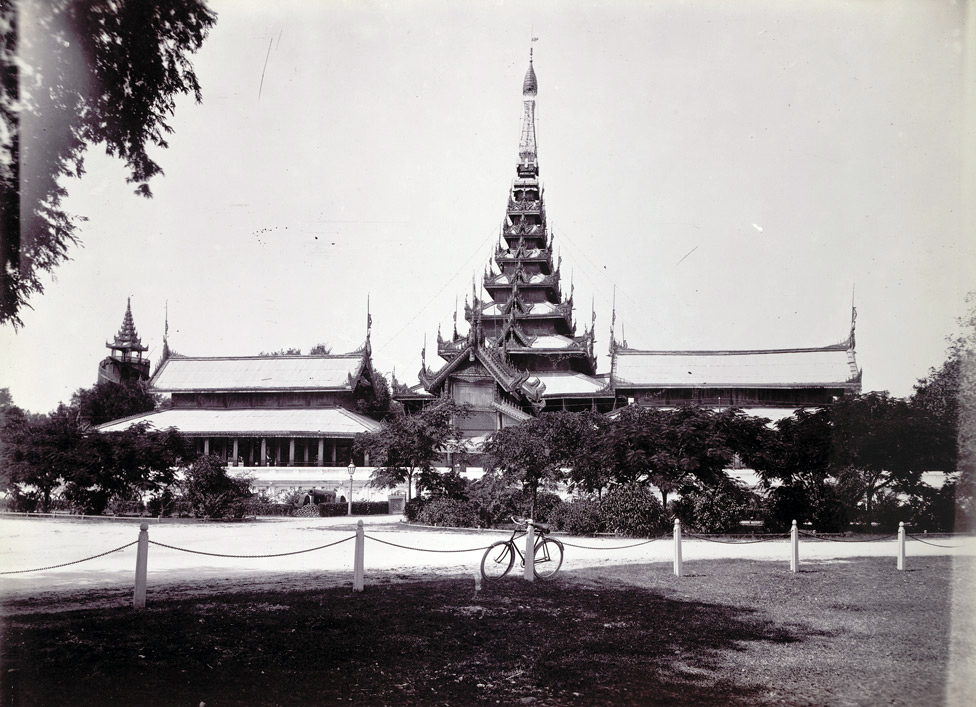
The Great Audience Hall in 1903

This hall itself is made up of three parts: the North (or Left) Audience Hall, and the South (or Right) Audience Hall; they were so called because, when the king was seated on the throne, facing the east, the first was to his left and the second to his right. These two parts or wings are connected by a transept running east to west from the flight of steps up to the railing around the throne; this transept was called the Central Audience Hall, because it was flanked by the Right and Left Halls. The Great Audience Hall as a whole measures, from north to south, 77.1 m (253 feet).

Below the palace platform, on each side of the flight of steps, on the east, may be seen a few old pattern European cannons and near them some heaps of cannonballs; a few other guns of the same pattern are placed also on the sides of the steps on the west front of the palace.

The Great Audience Hall was built with a special eye to external effect, and this object was attained by carving and gilding all the wooden parts of the roofs-except the panels between the two roofs, which were merely gilt-that is, the gables, barge-boards and eaves-boards. The carving is in low relief and consists principally of a lotus and foliage-band on the eaves-boards; the barge-boards are ornamented with a plain scroll design and surmounted by flamboyant which are very effective as a decoration. But the wealth of ornamentation is lavished on the corners of the hipped roofs and the points of the gables as well as their lower extremities. The corners of the hipped (lower) roofs are surmounted by two wooden boards, made up of several joined pieces and meeting so as to form a right angle at the corner; the chief motifs are flamboyant, foliage, lotus-bands and guilloches.

The angle represents a stylized peacock—the emblem of royalty—is surmounted by a finial; below the eaves-boards is a pendant turned in the lathe. This same peacock is everywhere found at the points of the gables, forming a hip-knob, with the pendant below. All these carvings, besides being gilt, were also decorated with simple glass mosaic. The details above given apply mostly to all the other apartments.

=== Lion Throne Room ===
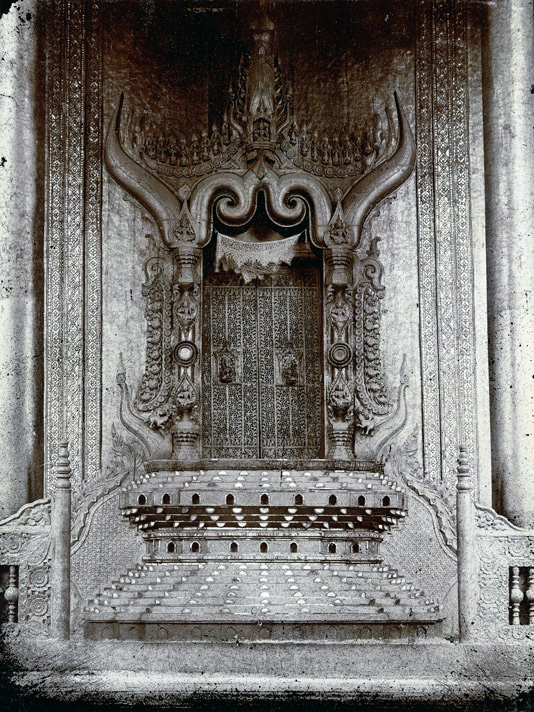
The Lion Throne in 1903

There were eight thrones in the palace, of which the Lion Throne (သီဟာသနပလ္လင်, Sihasana Palanka) was the greatest, and as such much more elaborately sculptured and finished than the others; an exact replica of the one in the palace was formerly in the Hluttaw. The king alone, of course, had a right to sit on it; and for anybody else to do so would be considered a case of high treason; the fact indeed was that anybody sitting on this throne was practically the king, if he could keep the rightful owner off. The base is a lotus throne formed of two lotuses, the upper one inverted on the top of the other; this pattern in no way differs from an ordinary altar supporting a Buddha image; but in the centre, where it is narrowest, that is, at the point where the two lotuses meet, is a small band containing a row of niches, with a somewhat larger one above it; in these niches were small figures of lions, besides the two large ones which may be seen now at each side of the throne. Access to the throne was obtained by means of a flight of steps in the room behind it from which it is shut off by a sliding door of gilt iron lattice work.

The other thrones were the Hintha Throne (ဟင်္သာသနပလ္လင်), Elephant Throne (Gajasana) in the Byedaik (Privy Council Hall), Thinga Throne, Deer Throne (Migasana), Peacock Throne (Marurasana), Lily Throne (ပဒုမ္မာသနပလ္လင်), and Bee Throne (Bhamarasana).

The original Lion Throne was saved from destruction in the bombings of World War II, because it was transported by the British authorities to India in 1885 after the Third Anglo-Burmese War, and later returned. It is now exhibited in the National Museum of Myanmar in Yangon.

=== Glass Palace ===
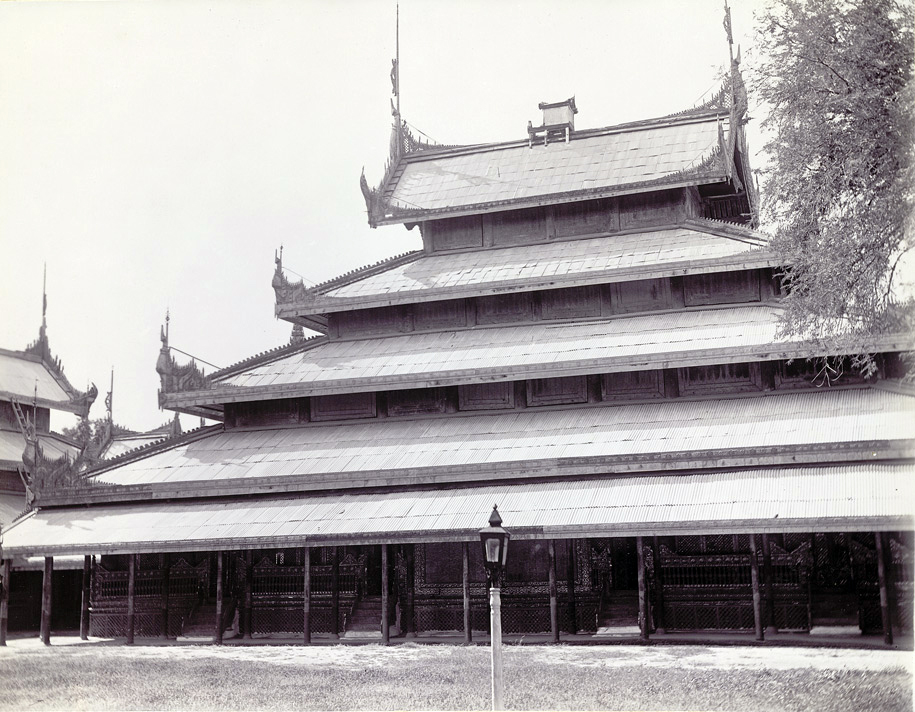
Left: The Glass Palace in 1903. Right: Design of the Glass Palace

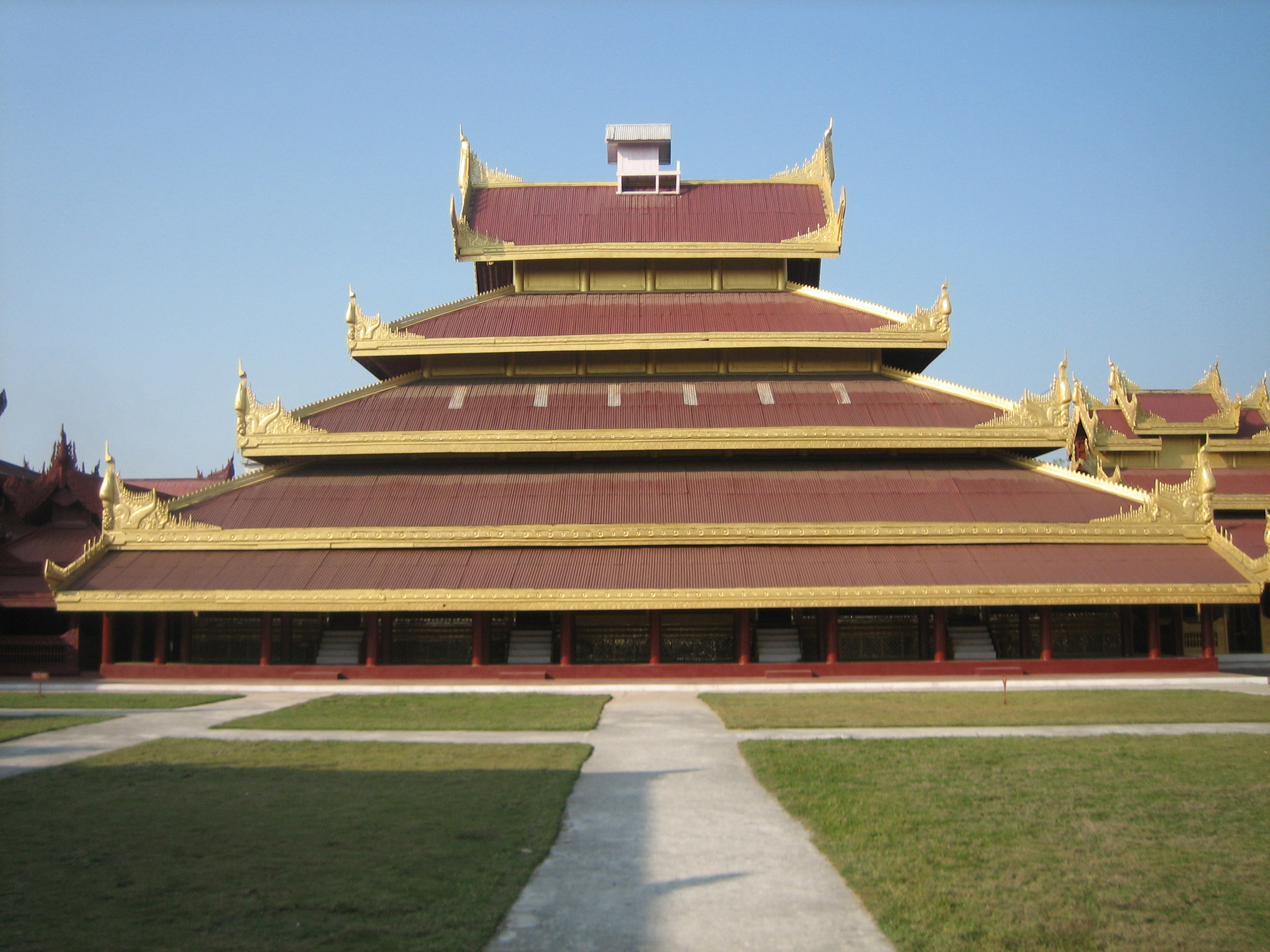
The Glass Palace today

Hmannandawgyi (မှန်နန်းတော်ကြီး) or Glass Palace, is the largest and considered one of the most beautiful apartments of the palace. It is believed to be King Mindon's principal living apartment of the palace. Like all the Throne rooms, it is divided by a wooden partition into two rooms.

In the east room is the Bee Throne (Bhamarasana), so called because it was adorned with figures of bees in the small niches at the bottom of the pedestal. This was where the ceremony for the nomination of the Chief Queen and the Royal nuptial were held. It was also where the king and queen celebrated the Burmese New Year, and where the formal ear piercing of young princesses took place. The body of King Mindon was laid out in this room for viewing after his death in 1878.

The west room, which was formerly divided into several smaller ones, was the principal living room of Mindon, and no other persons were allowed to sleep there except the four principal queens, to each of whom was appointed a room near the royal bed-chamber, which consisted of a small room surmounted by a pyatthat, or small spire consisting of seven superposed roofs similar to the Golden Spire over the Lion Throne Room on the cast of the palace. This pyatthat was of gilt copper. On each side of this spired-room were constantly kept open two white umbrellas. The ladies-in-waiting of the Glass Palace were, by turns, stationed around the west room to wait upon. Their Majesties; they, whether princesses or minor queens, were not allowed to enter this room with slippers on or with their golden umbrellas: they had to leave these at the entrance with their attendants.

In the time of King Thibaw, Queen Supayalat had a small room to herself in this west room of the Hmannan.

== Gallery ==
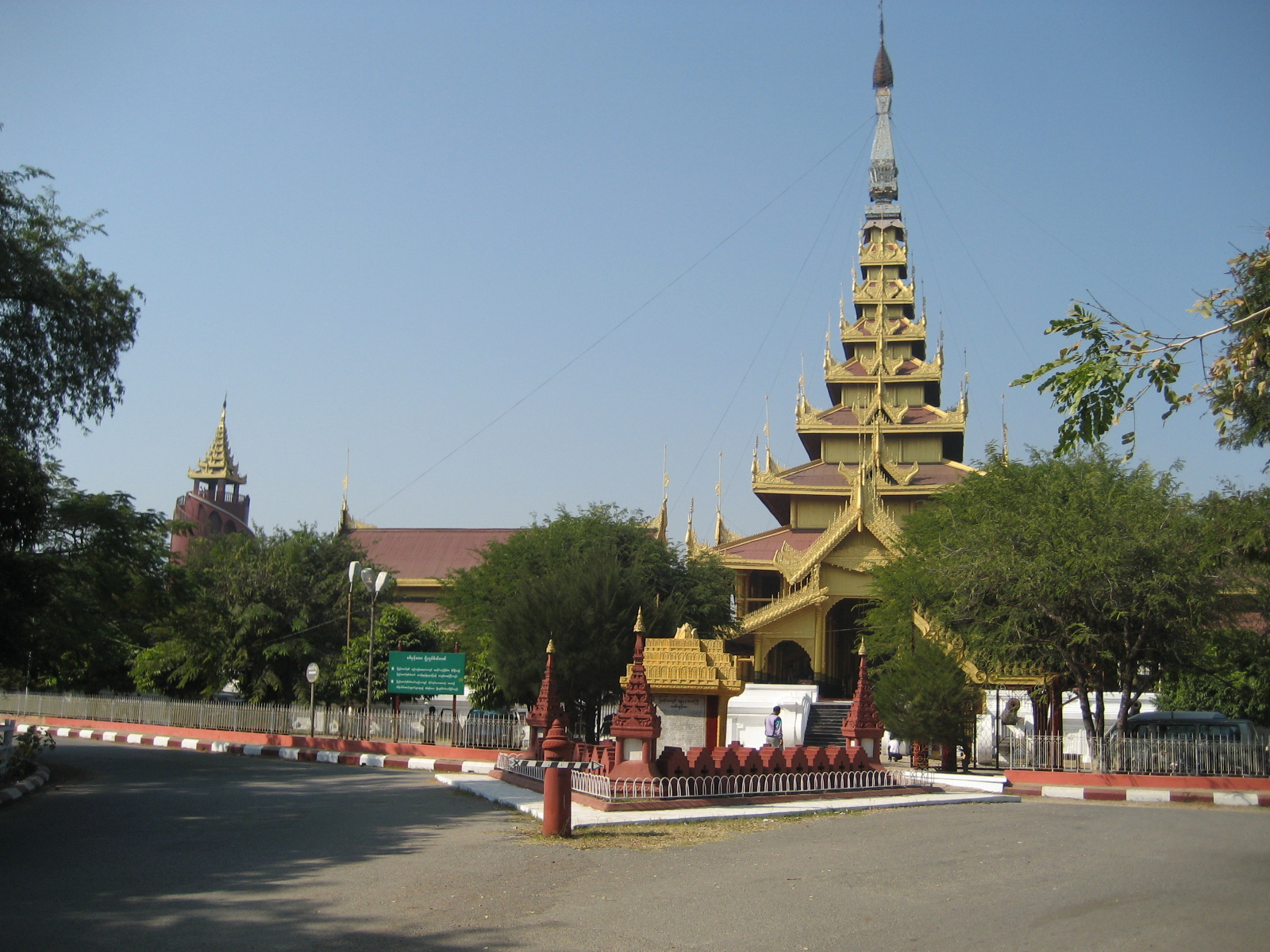
Front of the palace

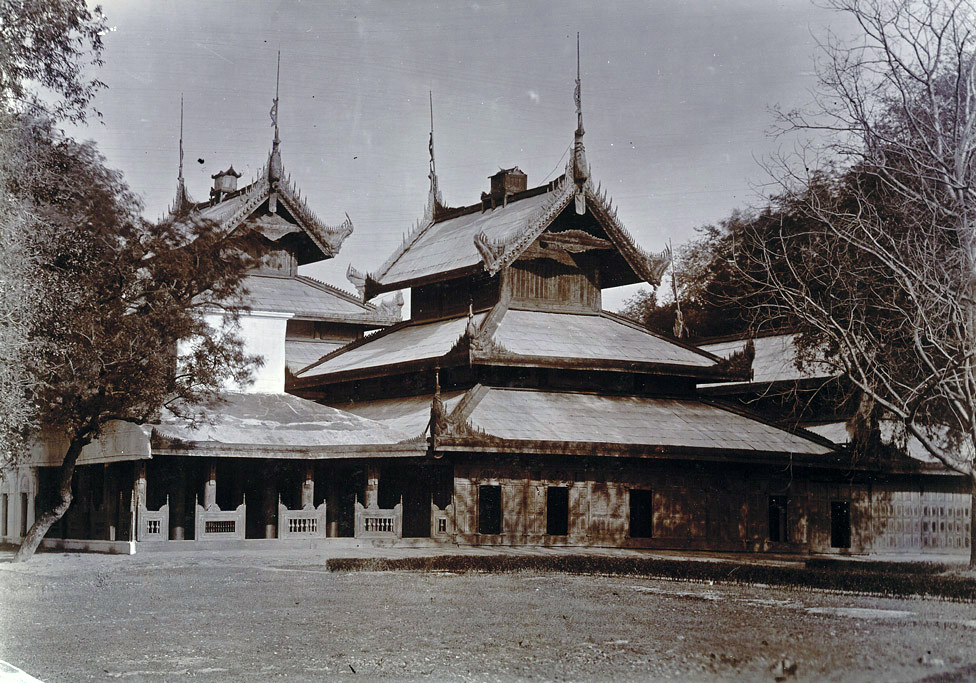
Chief Queen's Apartments

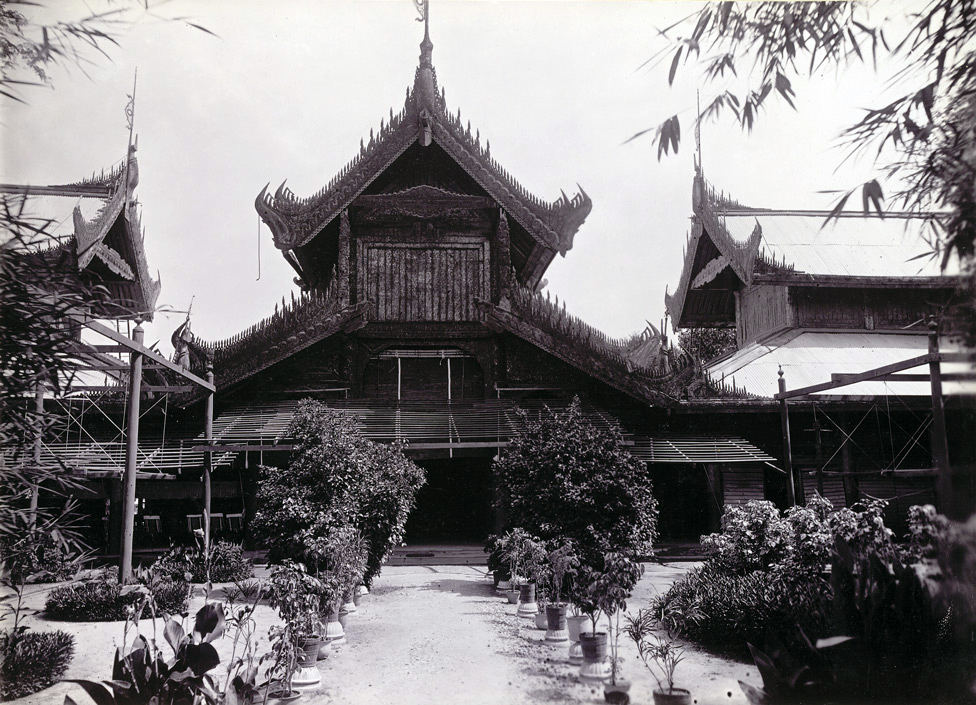
Lily Throne Hall in 1903

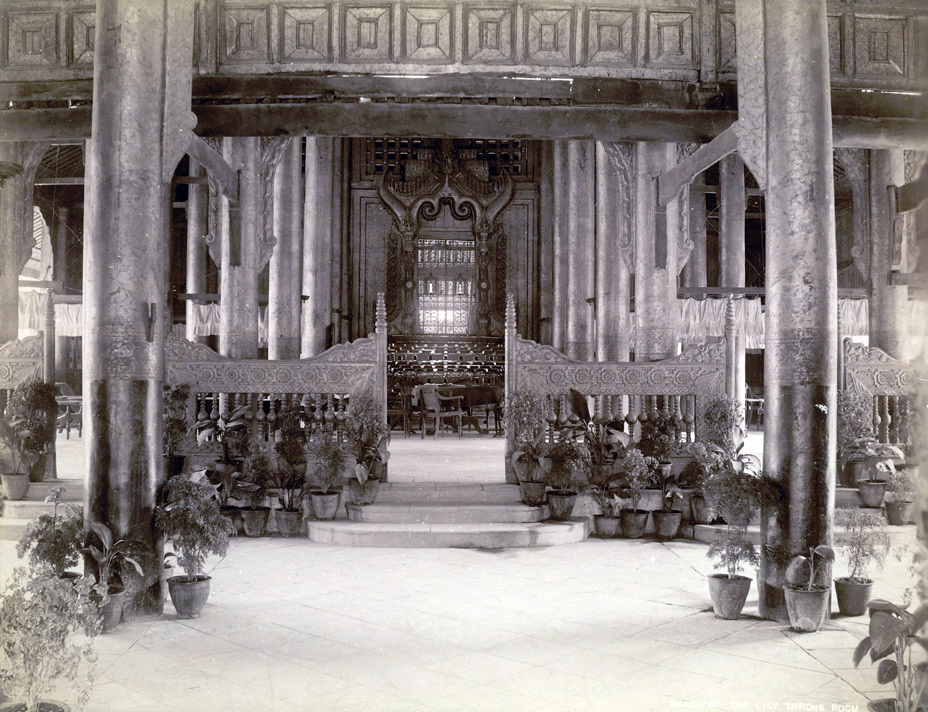
Lily Throne

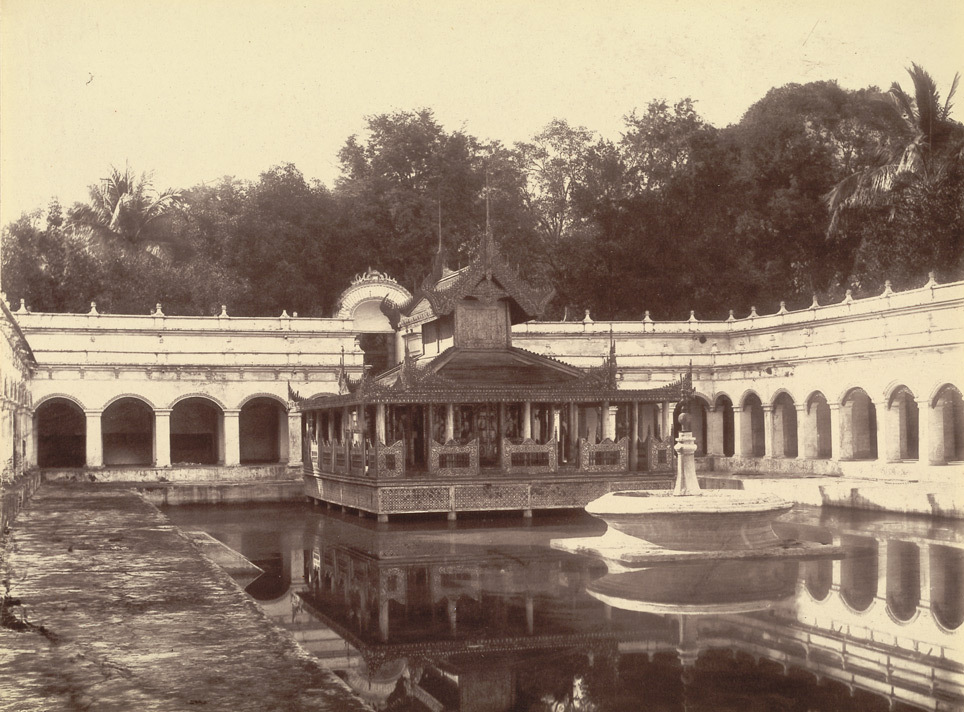
The Queen's Baths

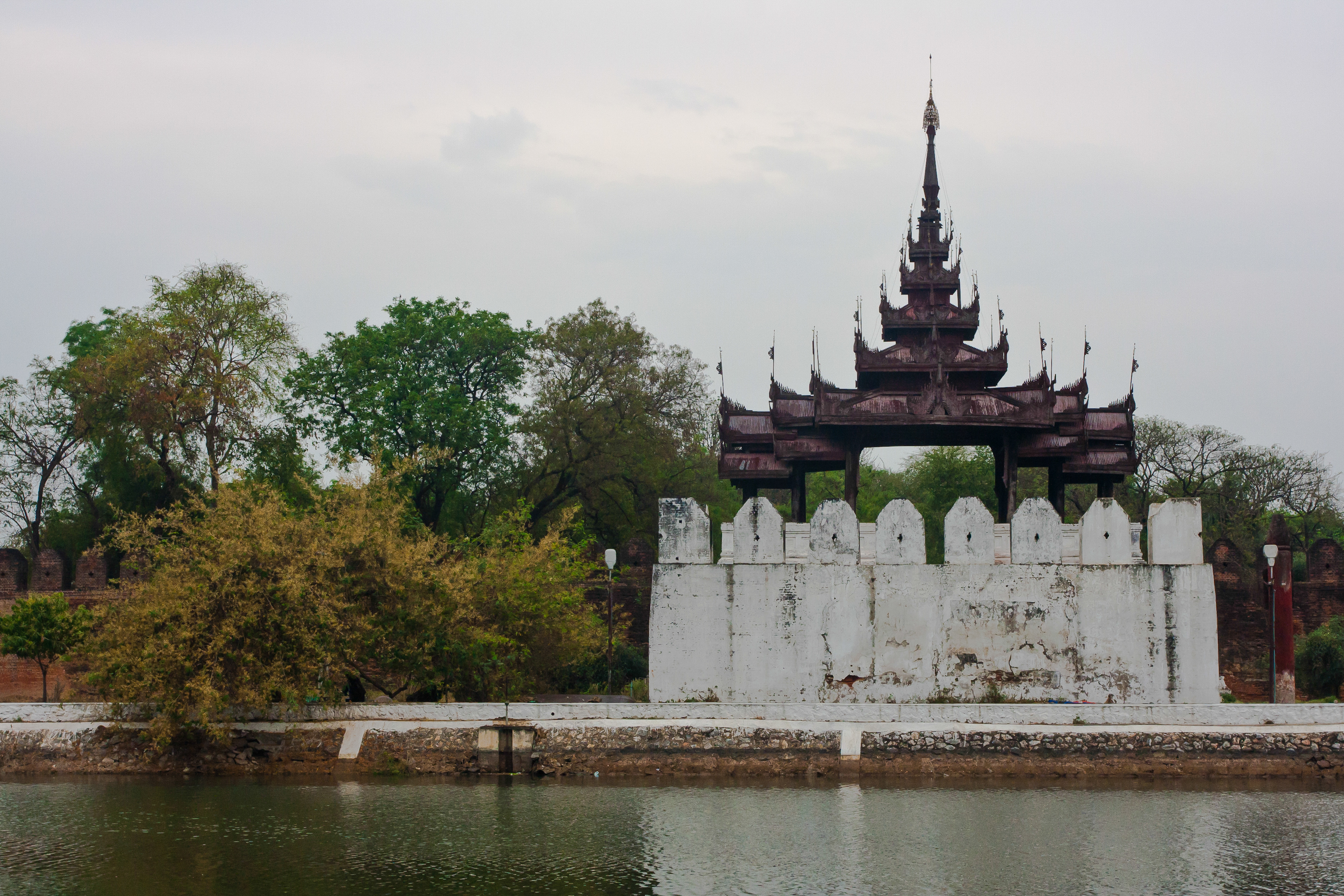
Mandalay Palace wall and bastion

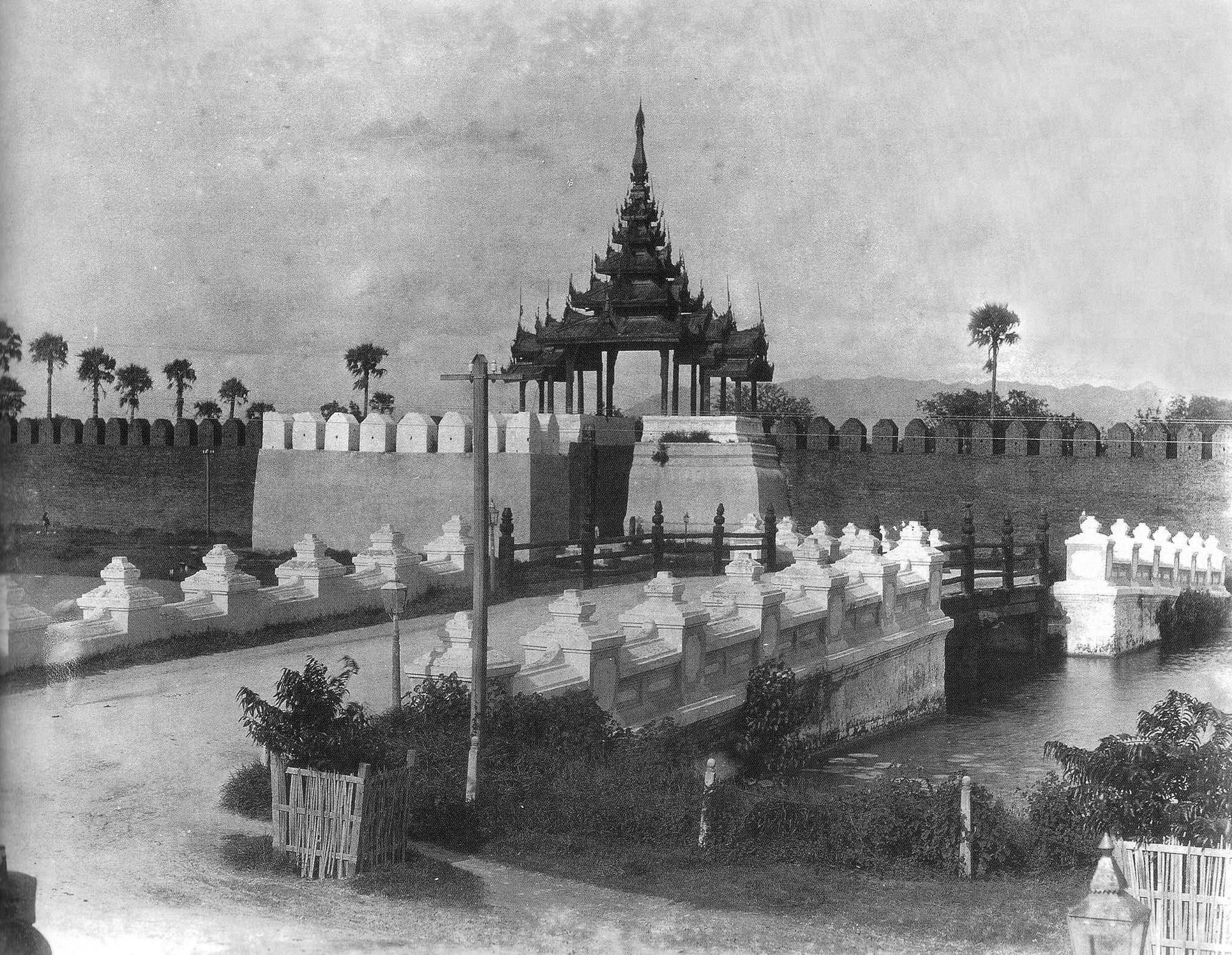
One of the gates

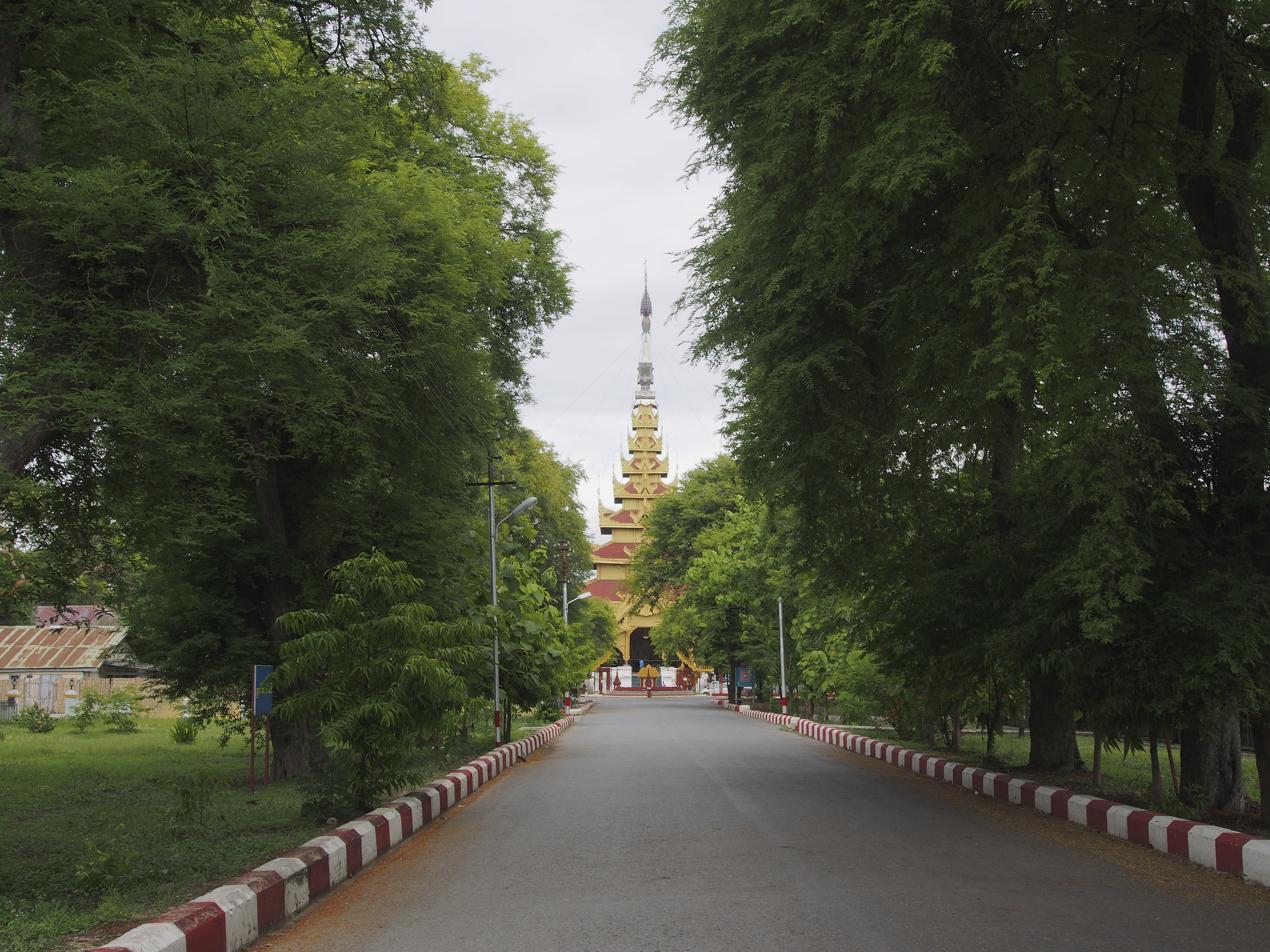
On the way to the palace

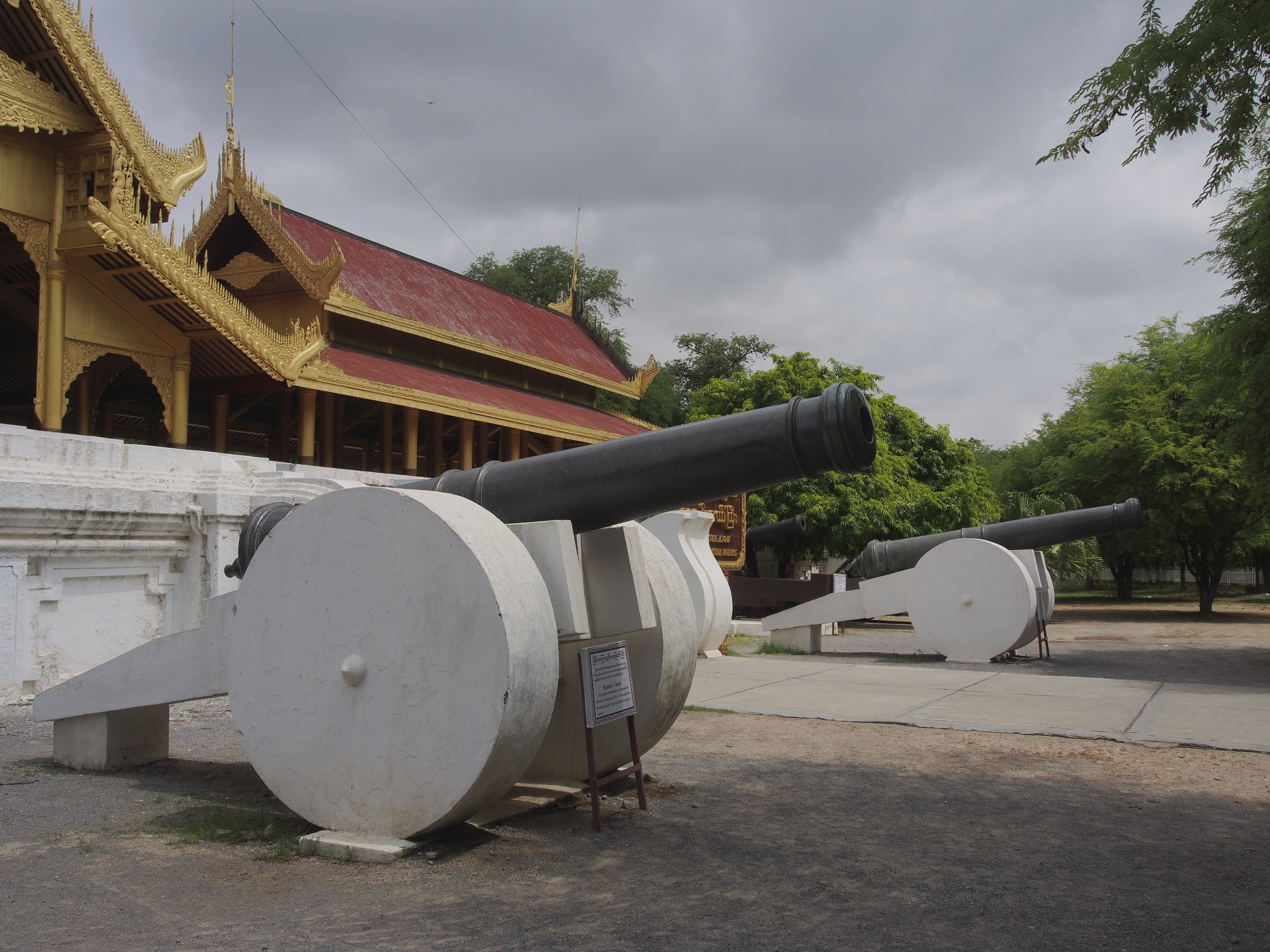
The cannon

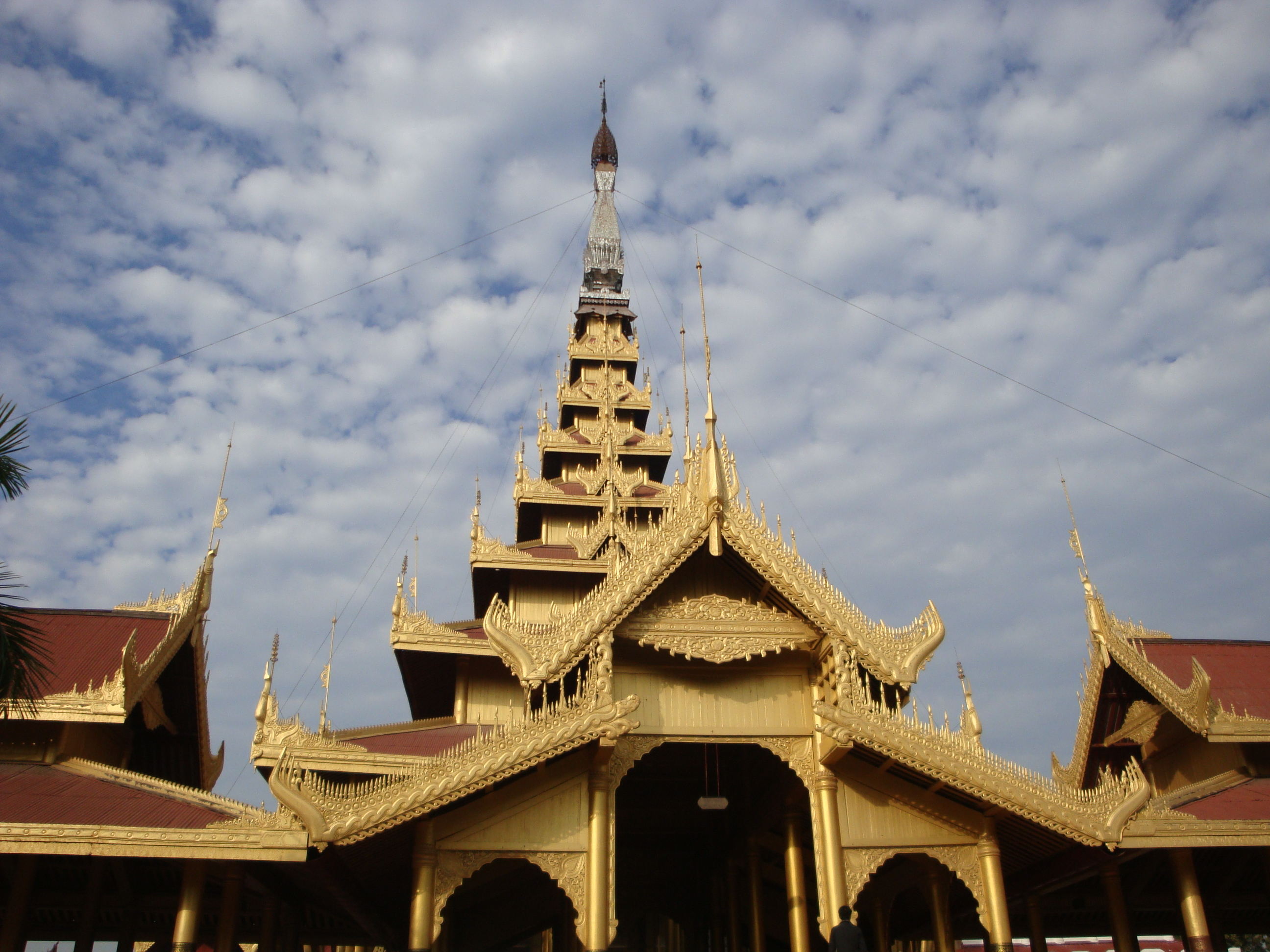
The MyayNanPyathat building

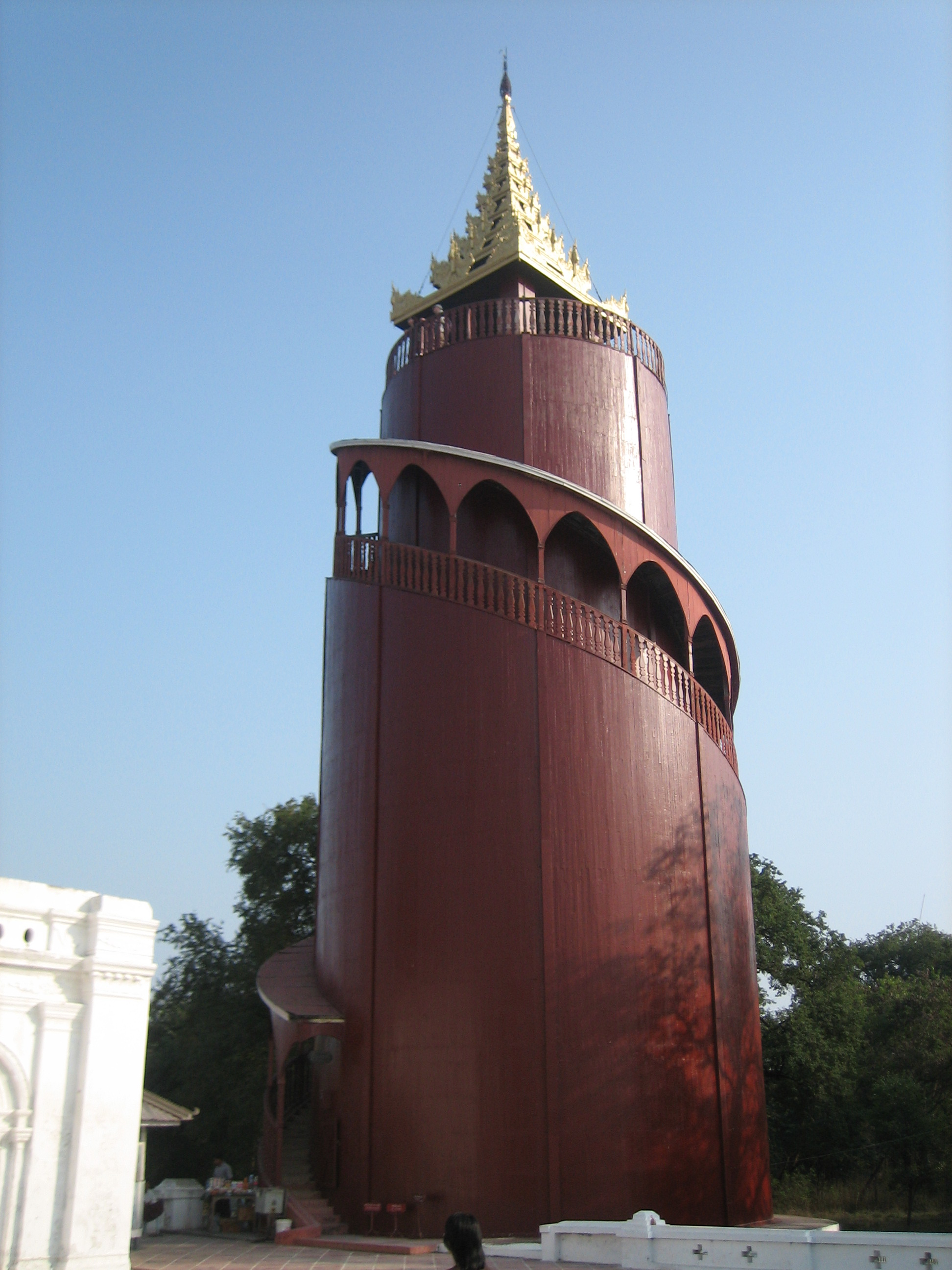
The watch tower

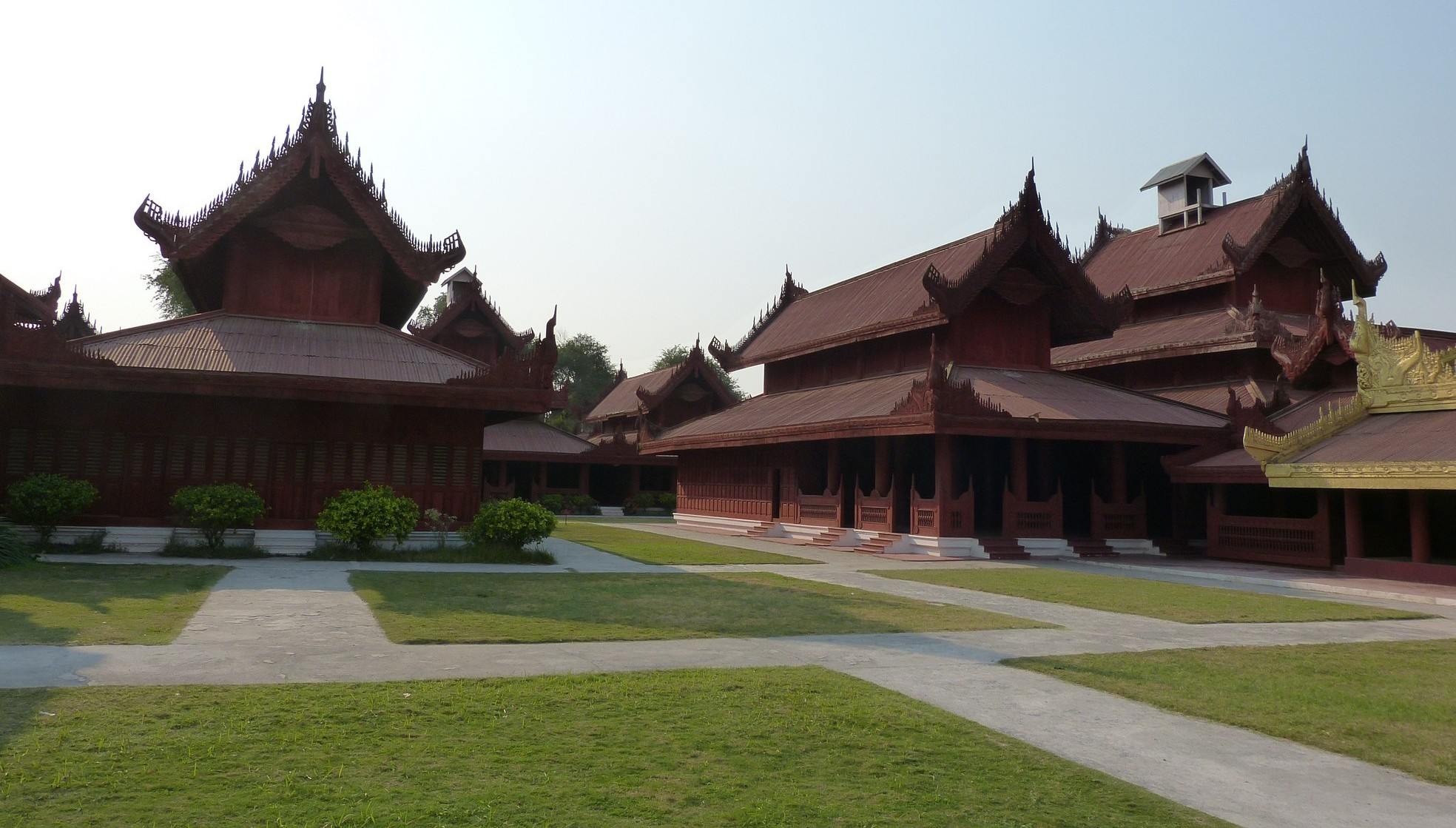
Inside of the palace compound

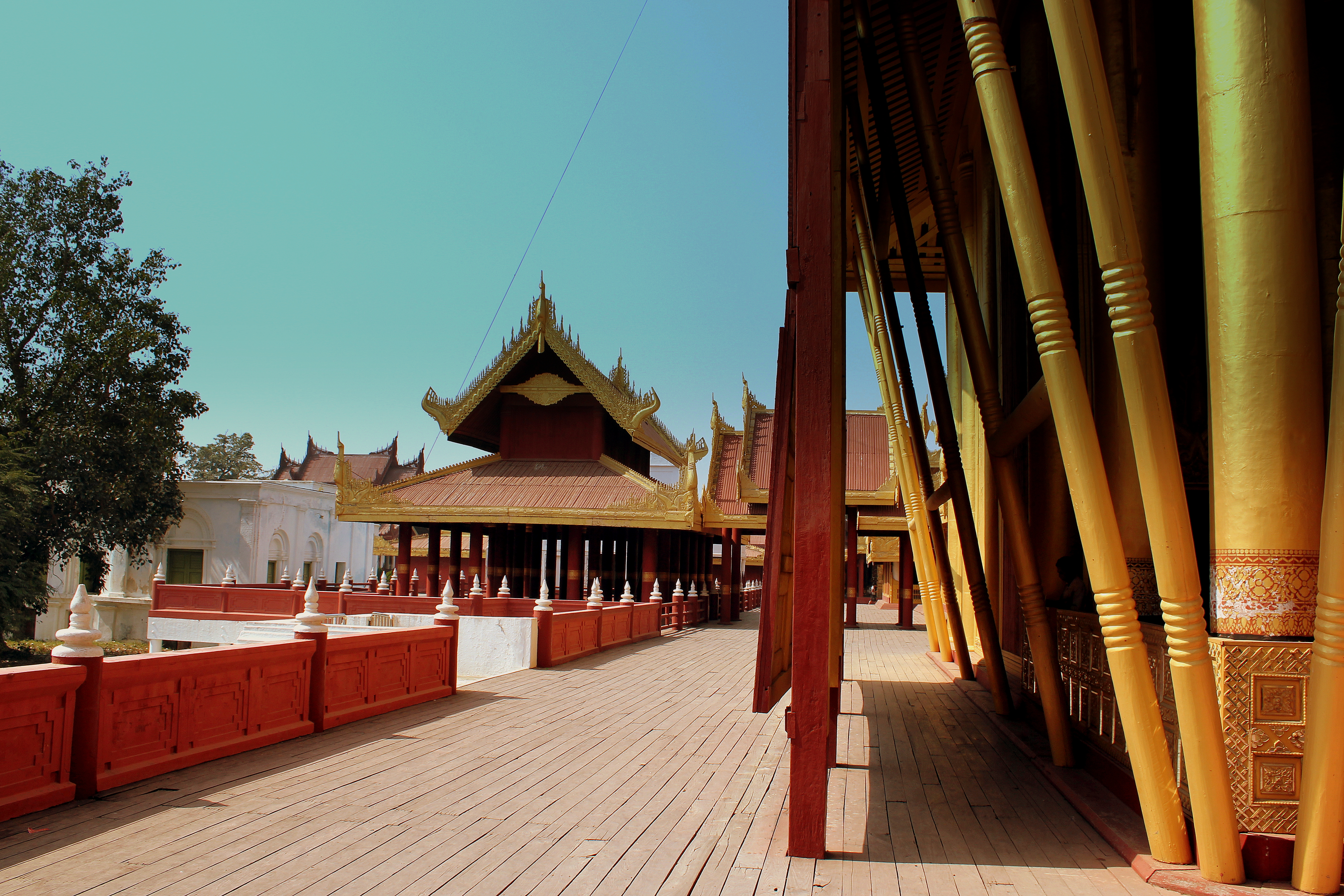
Inside of the palace compound

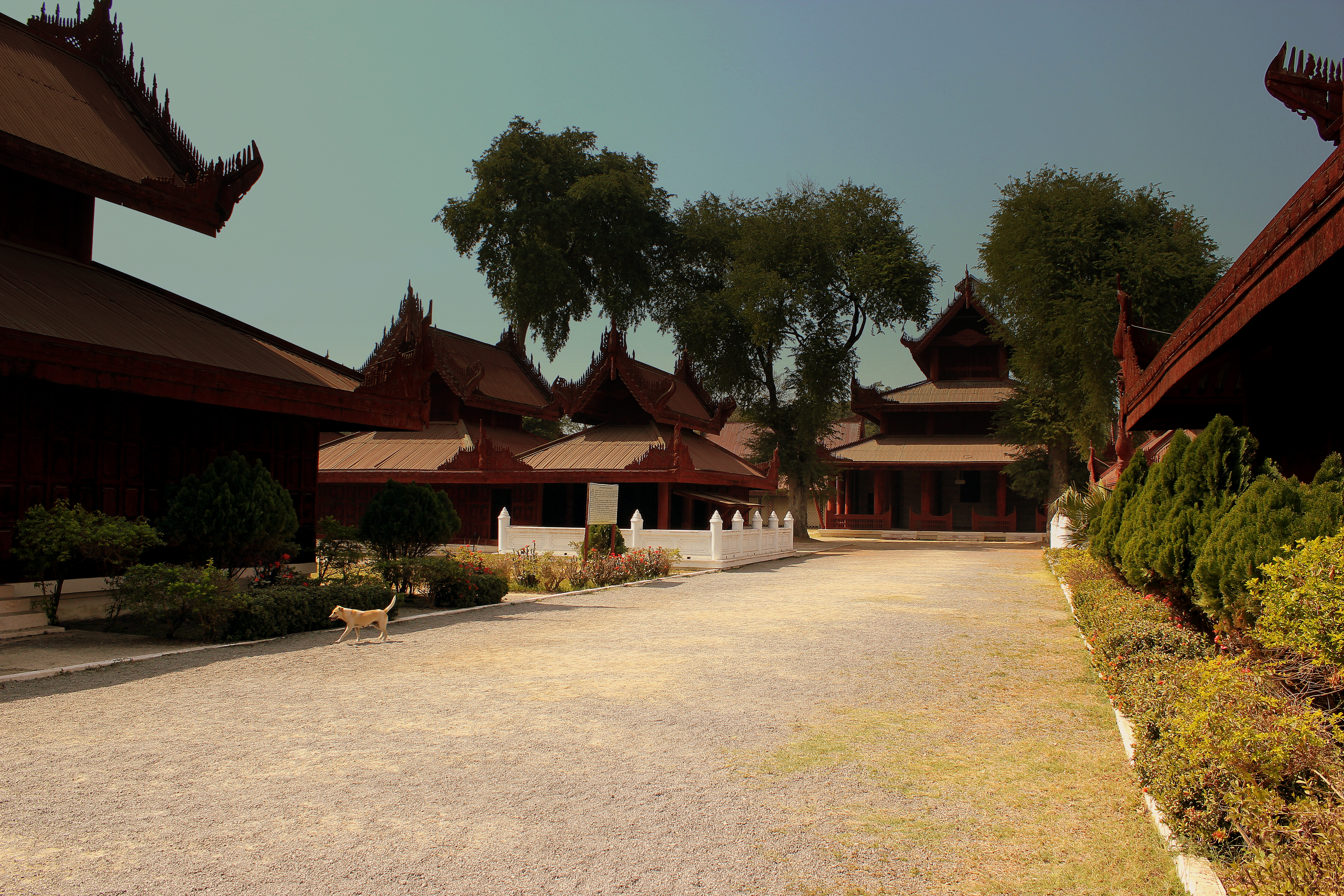

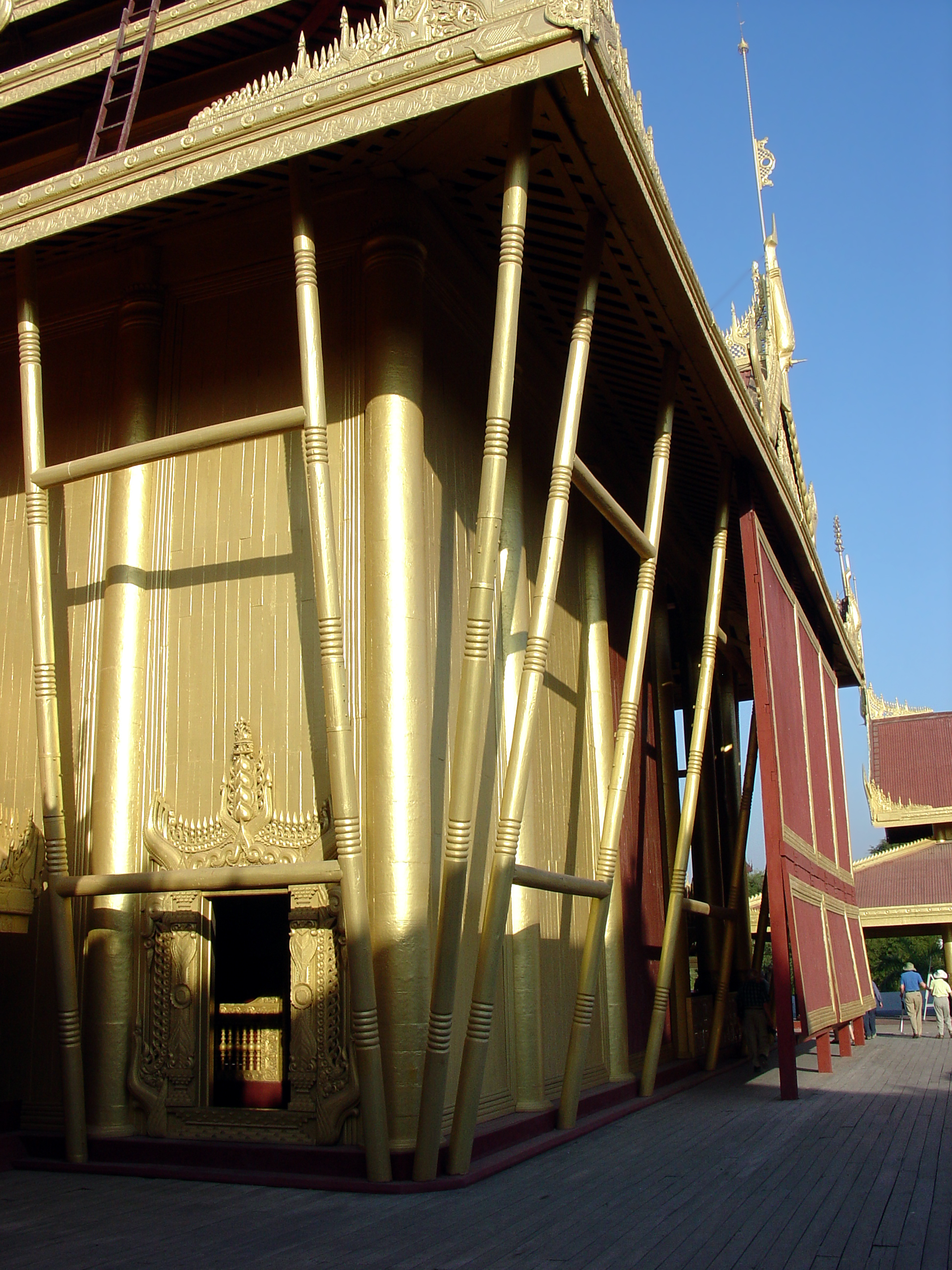

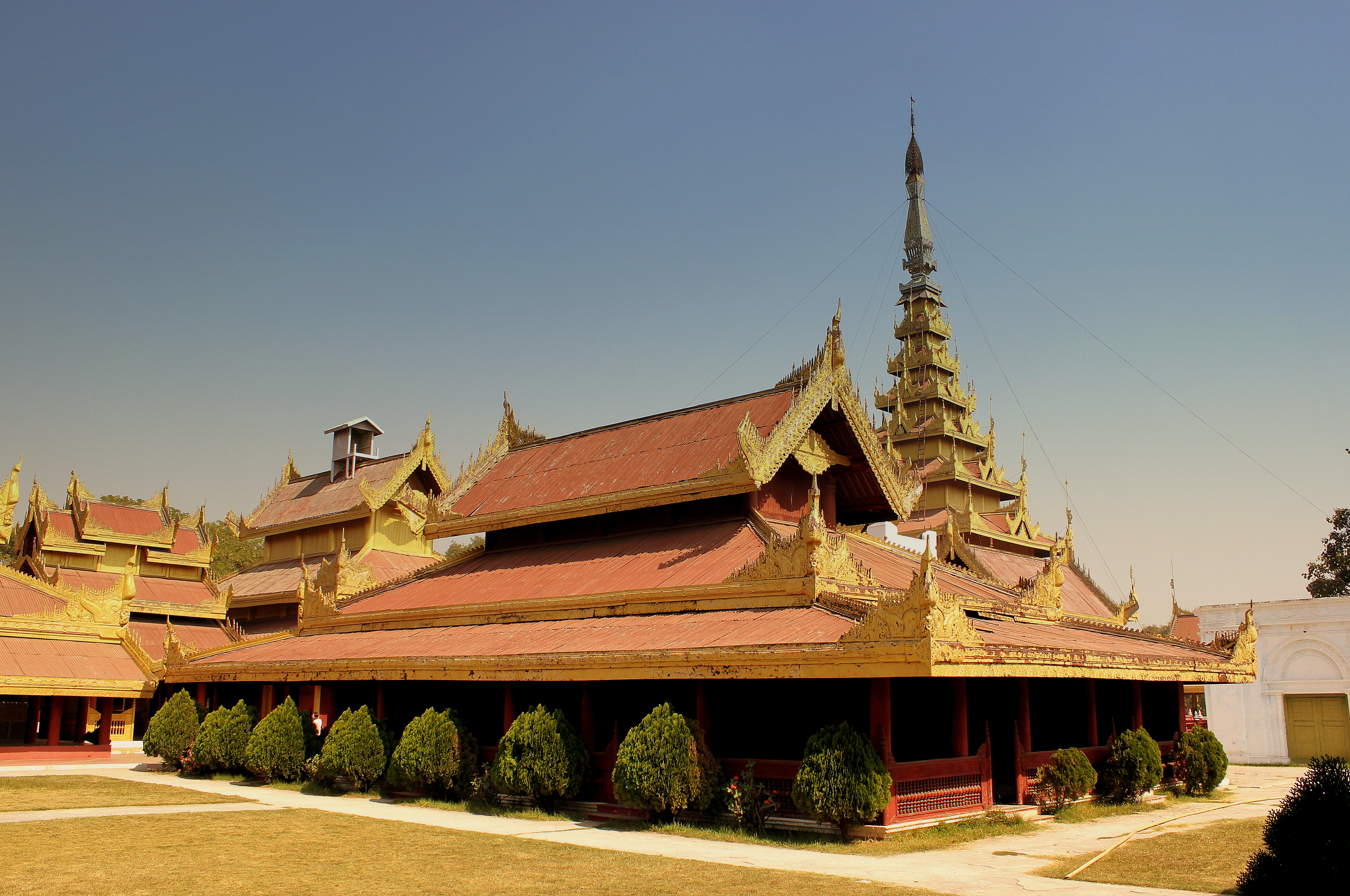

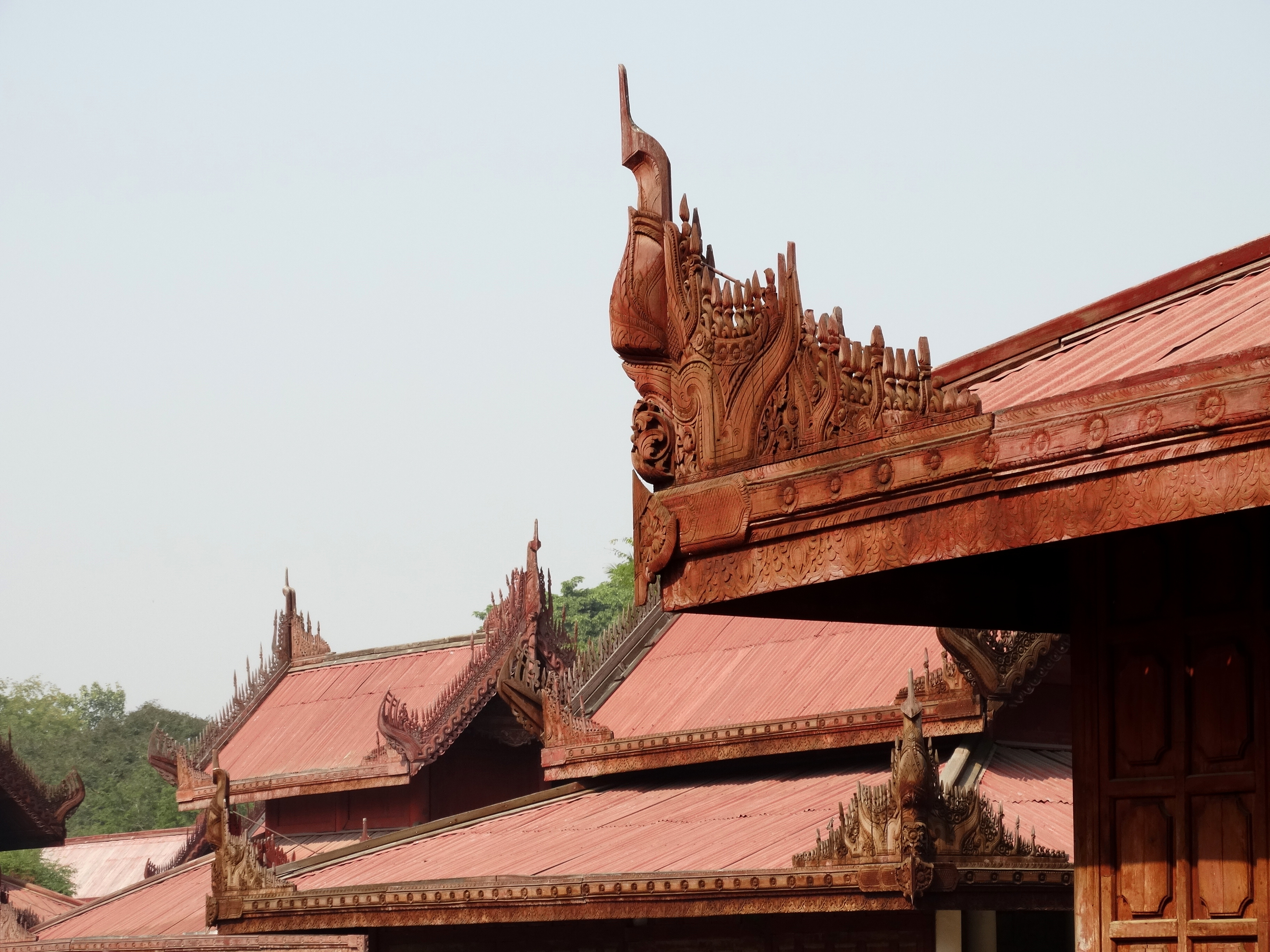

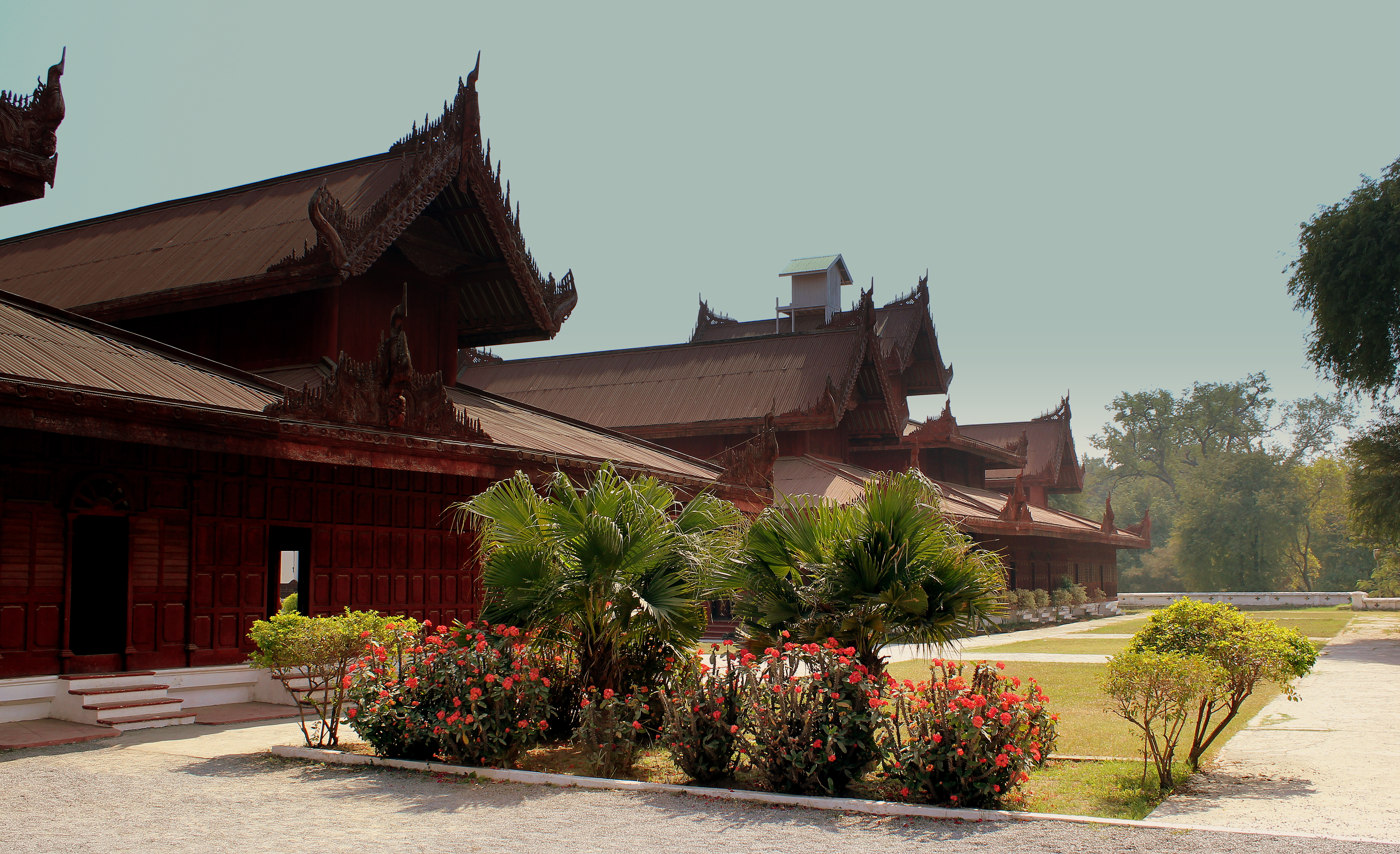

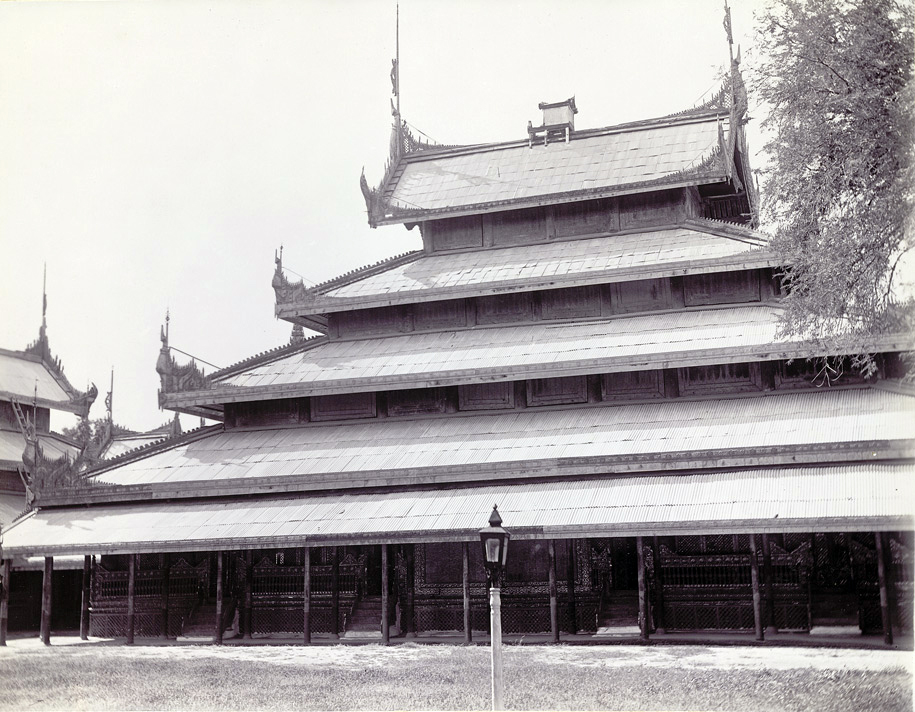
The HmanNan building

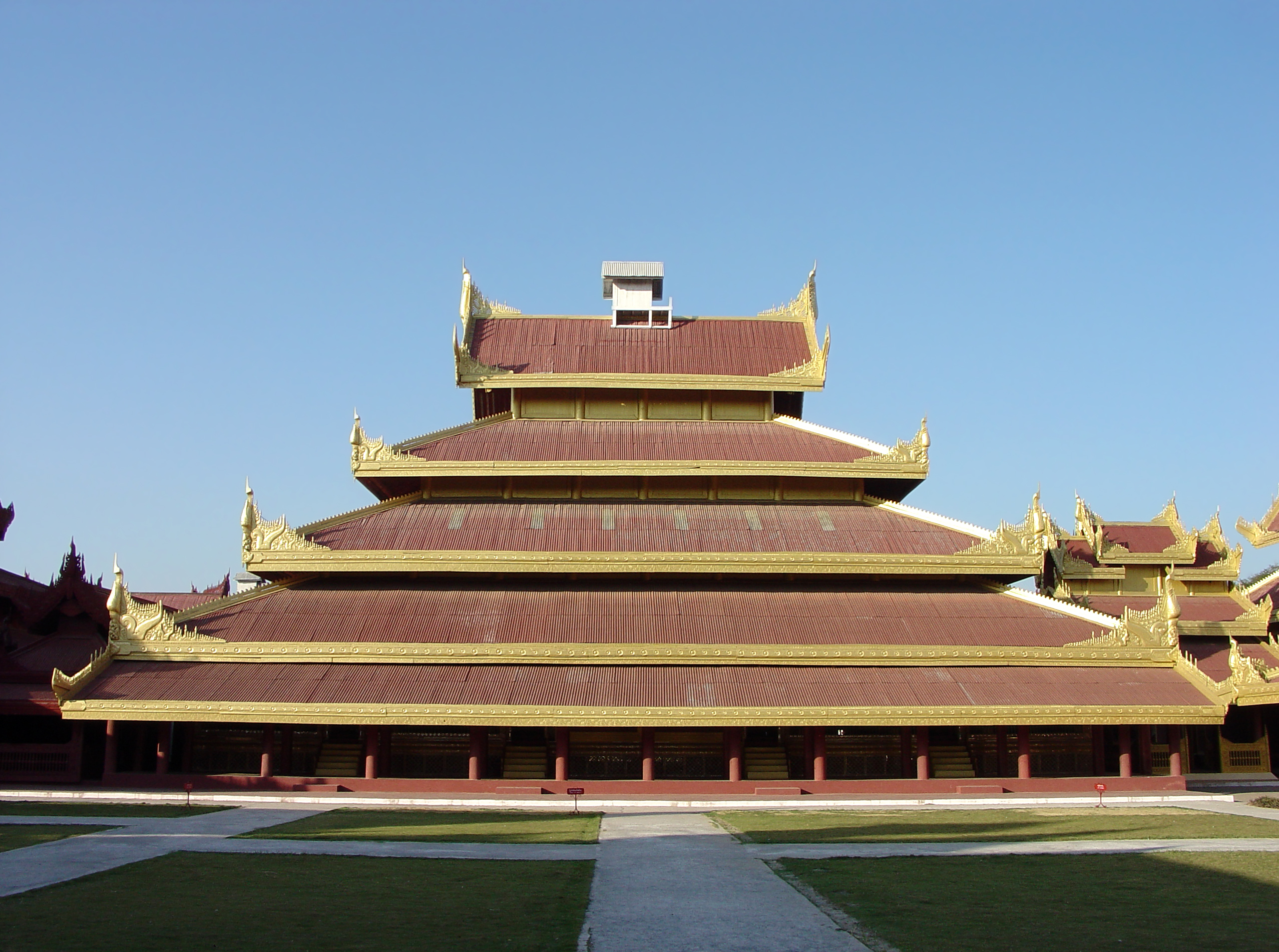
The HmanNan building

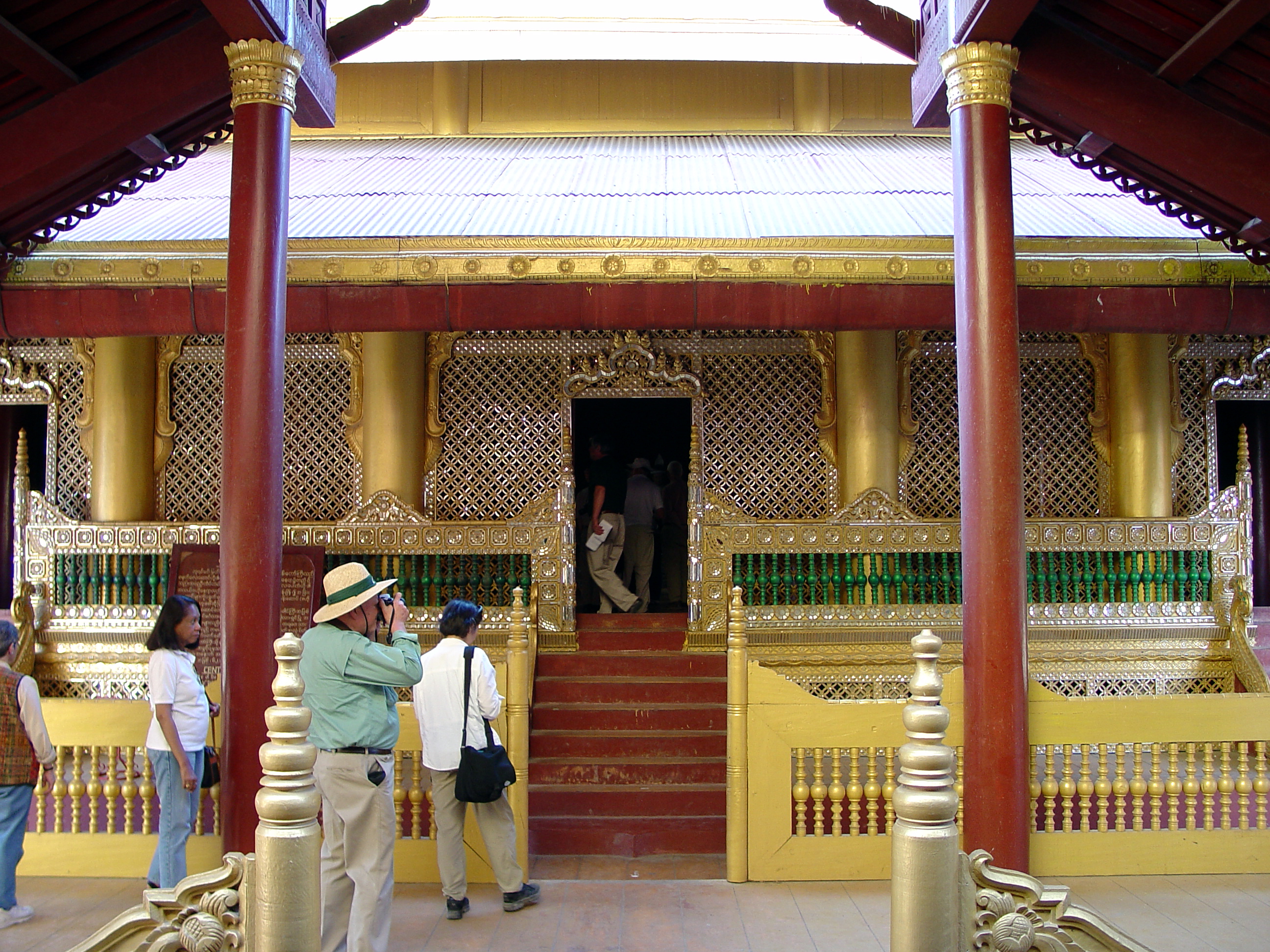
The HmanNan building

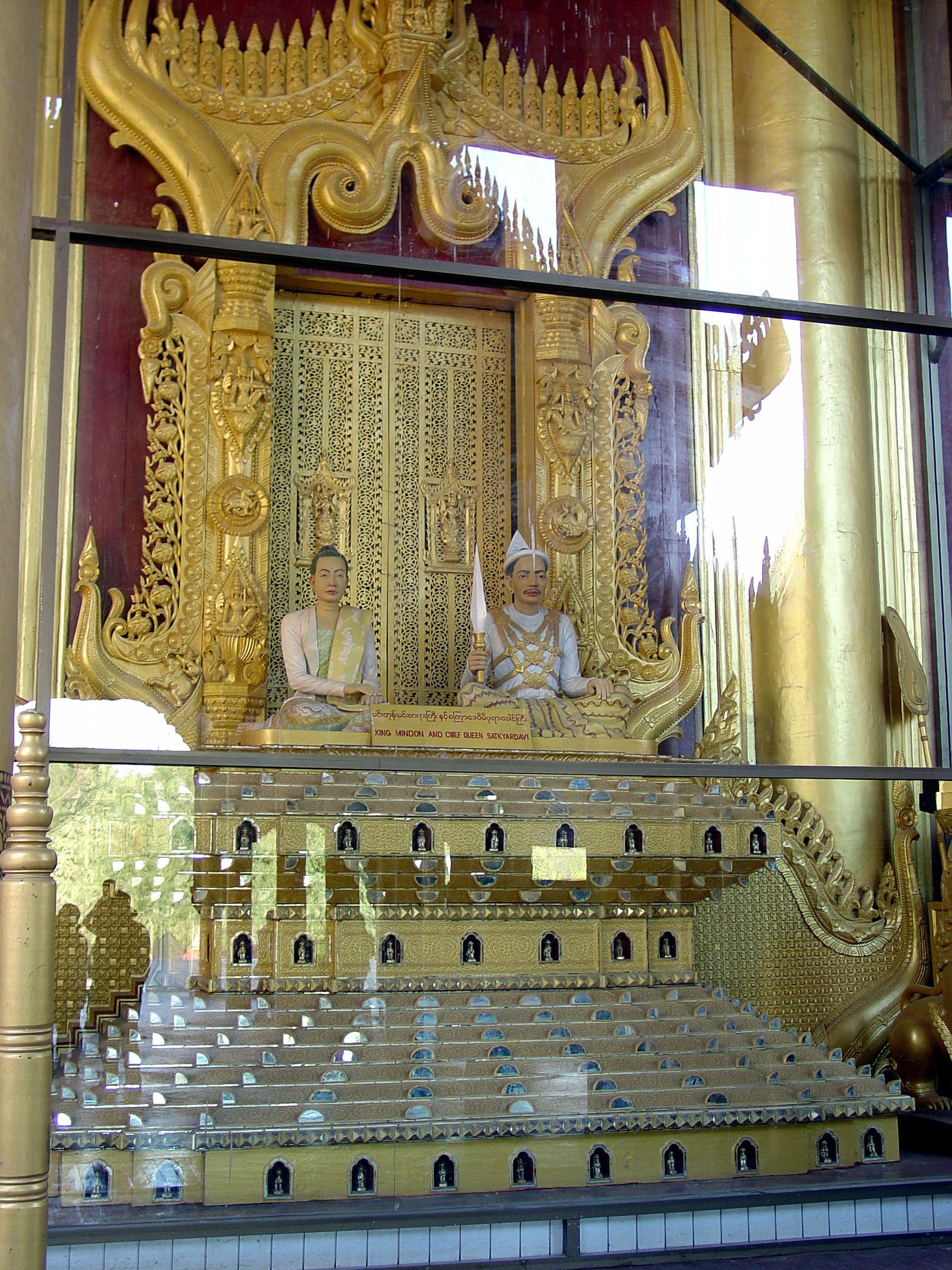
King Mindon and the Queen SatKyar Daywi

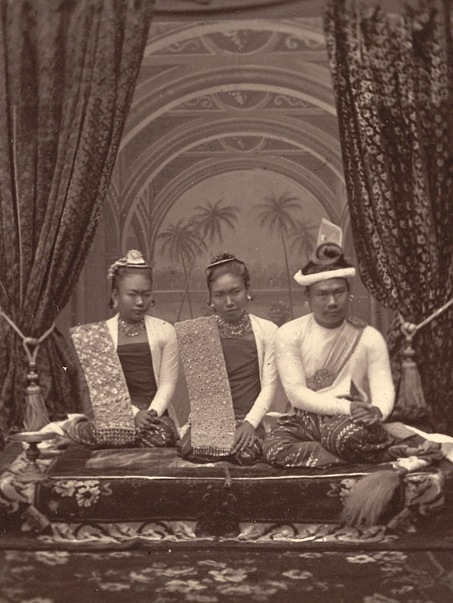
King Thibaw and Queen Su Payar Lat

== See also ==
- List of structures and infrastructure affected by the 2025 Myanmar earthquake
