= Sendai University =

Higher education institution in Miyagi, Japan

Coordinates: 38°3′4.9″N 140°46′17.4″E

- 仙台大学
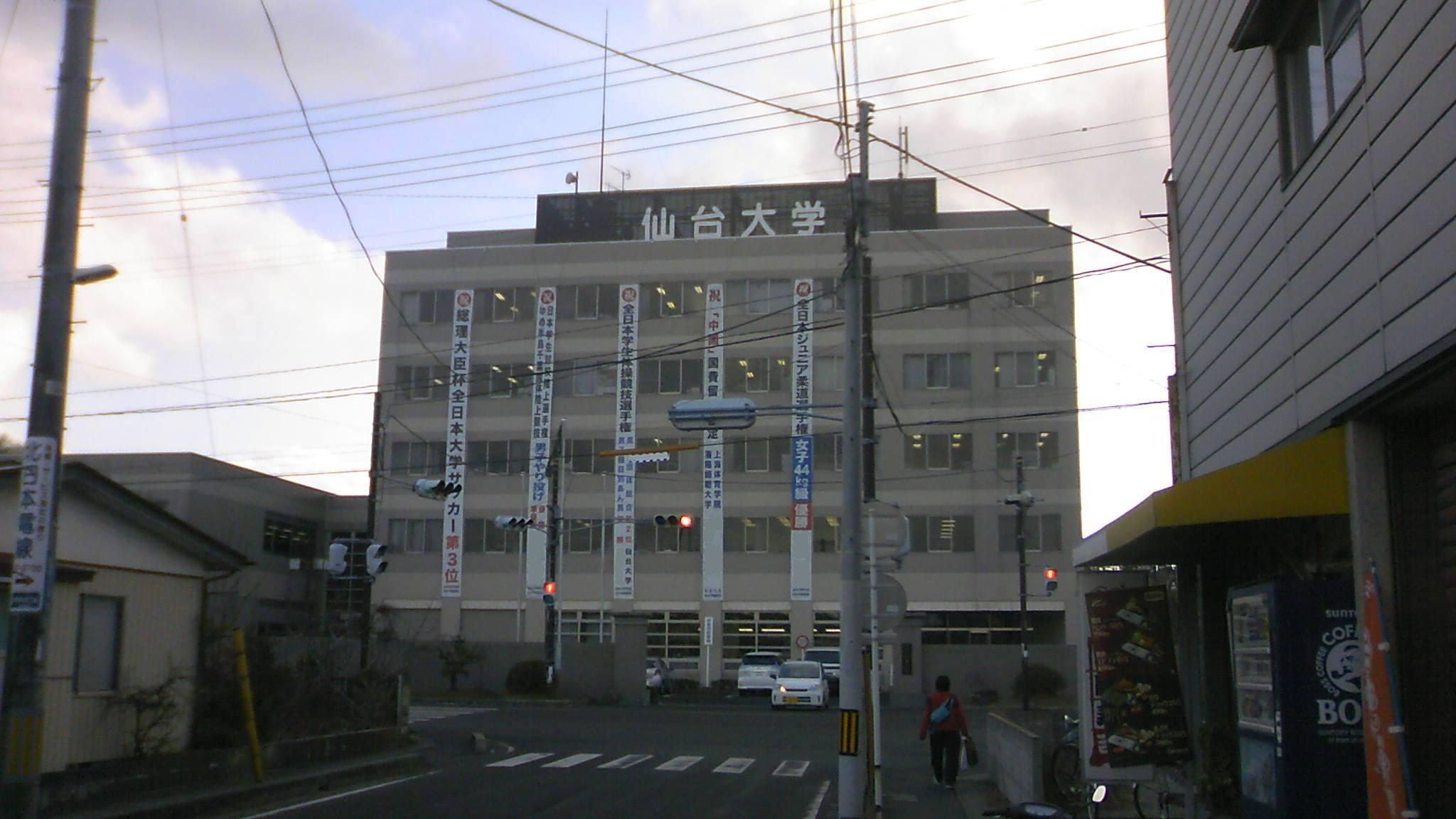
- Sendai University
- Type: Private
- Established: 1879 / 1967
- Location: Shibata, Miyagi Prefecture, Japan
- Website: www.sendaidaigaku.jp

Sendai University (仙台大学, Sendai daigaku) is a private university in Shibata, Miyagi, Japan, established in 1967. It is the only university specializing in physical education in northern Japan.

== History ==
Sendai University was established in 1967. The predecessor of the school was founded in 1879.

In February 2013, the Pāli Text Society, Sendai University, and the University of Toronto, along with local partners, began an ongoing initiative to digitise and catalogue Myanmar's palm-leaf manuscripts, including collections from U Pho Thi Library in Thaton, and Bagaya Monastery in Inwa. The digitised manuscripts are available at the open-access Myanmar Manuscript Digital Library.

== Organization ==
=== Undergraduate ===
- Faculty of Physical Education
  - Department of Physical Education (sports coaching, sports trainer, sports management courses
  - Health and Welfare Department (Exercise and Nutrition courses)
  - Sports Information Department (Mass Media, sports information strategy)
  - Modern Martial Arts Department

=== Graduate ===
- Graduate School of Sport Sciences (MSc)

== Alumni ==
- Shuichi Akai (footballer)
- Shinji Doigawa
- Tsuyoshi Furukawa
- Koji Hachisuka
- Hironobu Haga
- Sōta Hirayama, footballer
- Junya Hosokawa
- Reiichi Ikegami
- Masaru Inada, skeleton racer
- Dan Ito
- Hideki Uchidate, footballer
- Seiji Kawakami
- Nozomi Komuro
- Kazuhiro Koshi, skeleton racer
- Kento Kumabara, baseball player
- Toshiki Kuroiwa
- Masakatsu Sawa
- Hikaru Minegishi, footballer
- Yoshinobu Minowa
- Shinji Miura
- Tomohiro Moriyama, basketball coach
- Takumi Obara, Triathlete
- Takako Oguchi
- Yoshitaka Ohashi
- Hiroaki Okuno (footballer)
- Keita Saito
- Daisuke Sato (footballer)
- Mitsuhiro Sato
- Shinya Sato, basketball player
- Takuya Sugai
- Yukiya Sugita
- Hiroshi Suzuki (bobsledder)
- Hiroatsu Takahashi
- Naomi Takewaki
- Miki Tanaka, Judoka
- Yoshiichi Watanabe
- Yuji Yaku
- Mitsuo Yamada
