= Pitakataik (Bagan) =

Library of Buddhist scriptures built during Burmese Pagan period

- ပိဋကတ်တိုက်
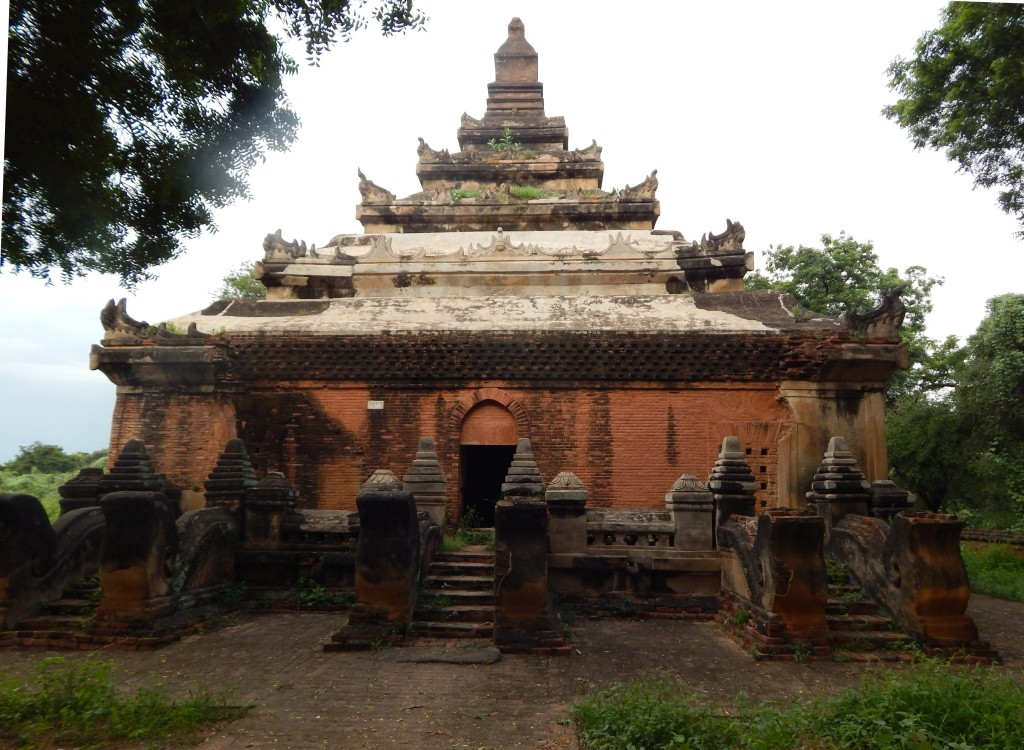
- Pitakataik (Bagan)

Religion
- Affiliation: Theravada Buddhism

Location
- Location: Bagan, Mandalay Region
- Country: Myanmar
- Interactive map of Pitakataik
- Coordinates: 21°10′16″N 94°51′49″E

Architecture
- Founder: King Anawrahta
- Completed: 1058; 968 years ago

The Bagan Pitakataik (Burmese: ပိဋကတ်တိုက်, pronounced [bḭ.də.gaʔ.taɪ̯ʔ]) is a library in Bagan. Pitakataik means "library of Buddhist Scriptures". The library in Bagan was created after a conquest of Thaton, where Anawratha seized 30 elephant-loads of Buddhist scripture. He then built a library in 1058 to house these documents. He used a style known as "Gu" which is an early Bagan Cave Style. The material was light-sensitive so the building had limited windows decorated with chinthe imaged on each side. There are three windows on each side. There are three doors which are all on one side (front). The library is square-shaped with each side measuring 51 feet (16 m) long.

It was restored in 1738 by King Bodawpaya of the Konbaung Dynasty. The architecture of this library is notable because of its square shape, perforated stone windows and the plaster carvings that are on the roof which are examples of Myanmar architecture.

== See also ==
- Tipiṭaka
- Pitakataik
- Pitakataik (Mandalay)
- Tripiṭaka tablets at Kuthodaw Pagoda
- U Pho Thi Library
