= Pitakataik (Mandalay) =

Royal Tipiṭaka library commissioned by King Mindon in 1857

- ပိဋကတ်တိုက်
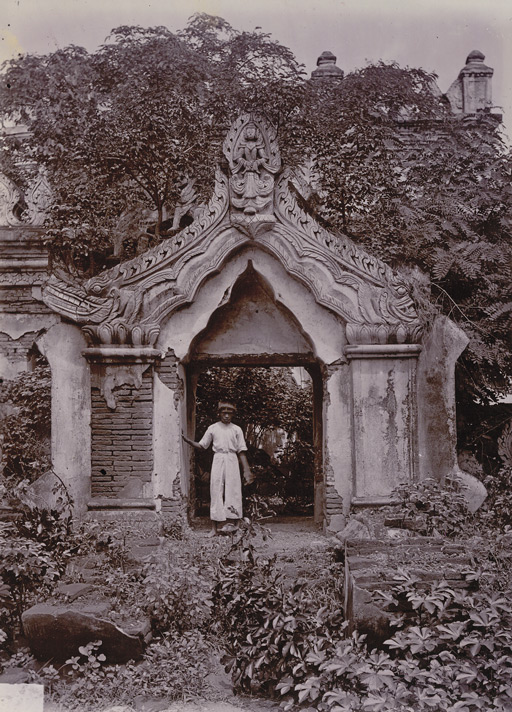
- Entrance gate of Pitakataik (Mandalay)

- Location in Mandalay, Myanmar
- Alternative names: Bidagat Taik

General information
- Type: Buddhist library
- Architectural style: Traditional Burmese masonry
- Location: Foot of Mandalay Hill, Mandalay, Myanmar
- Coordinates: 22°00′22″N 96°06′26″E
- Construction started: 1857
- Completed: 1864
- Opened: 1864
- Renovated: 2013
- Client: King Mindon Min

Technical details
- Structural system: Masonry with teak joints
- Floor count: 1

The Mandalay Pitakataik (Burmese: ပိဋကတ်တိုက်; also Pitaka-taik) was the royal library in Mandalay, commissioned by King Mindon Min in 1857 during the founding of Mandalay as a royal capital. The library was one of seven structures built to mark the foundation and consecration of Mandalay as the royal capital. It was located at the foot of Mandalay Hill, and was a masonry building with teak joints. The building was modeled after the Pitakataik in Bagan. Copies of Tipiṭaka texts were relocated from the Amarapura Pitakataik and deposited at the newly constructed library in January 1864. The Pitakataik was formerly stocked with Pali and Burmese palm leaf manuscripts which were looted with the onset of British occupation in 1885.

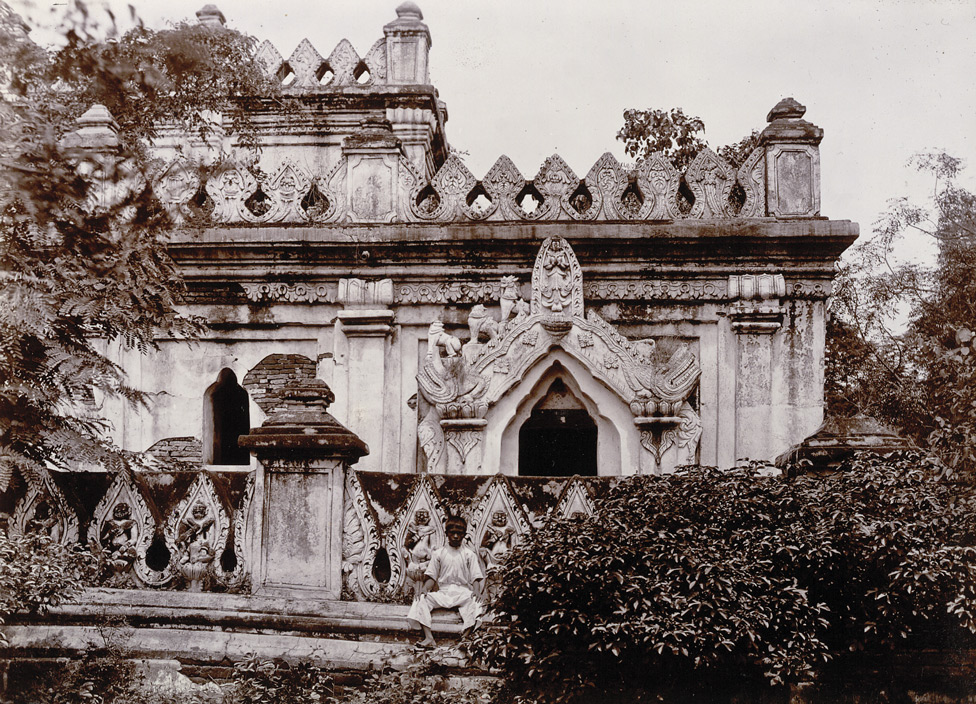
Parapet of Bidagat-taik in 1904

In October 2013, the Sitagu Sayadaw announced a donation to rebuild the Pitakataik, along with the Thudhamma Zayat and Maha Pahtan Ordination Hall, with the consultation of Tampawaddy U Win Maung.

== See also ==
- Tipiṭaka
- Pitakataik
- Pitakataik (Bagan)
- Tripiṭaka tablets at Kuthodaw Pagoda
- U Pho Thi Library
