= Wat Apson Sawan =

Buddhist temple in Bangkok, Thailand

- Wat Mu
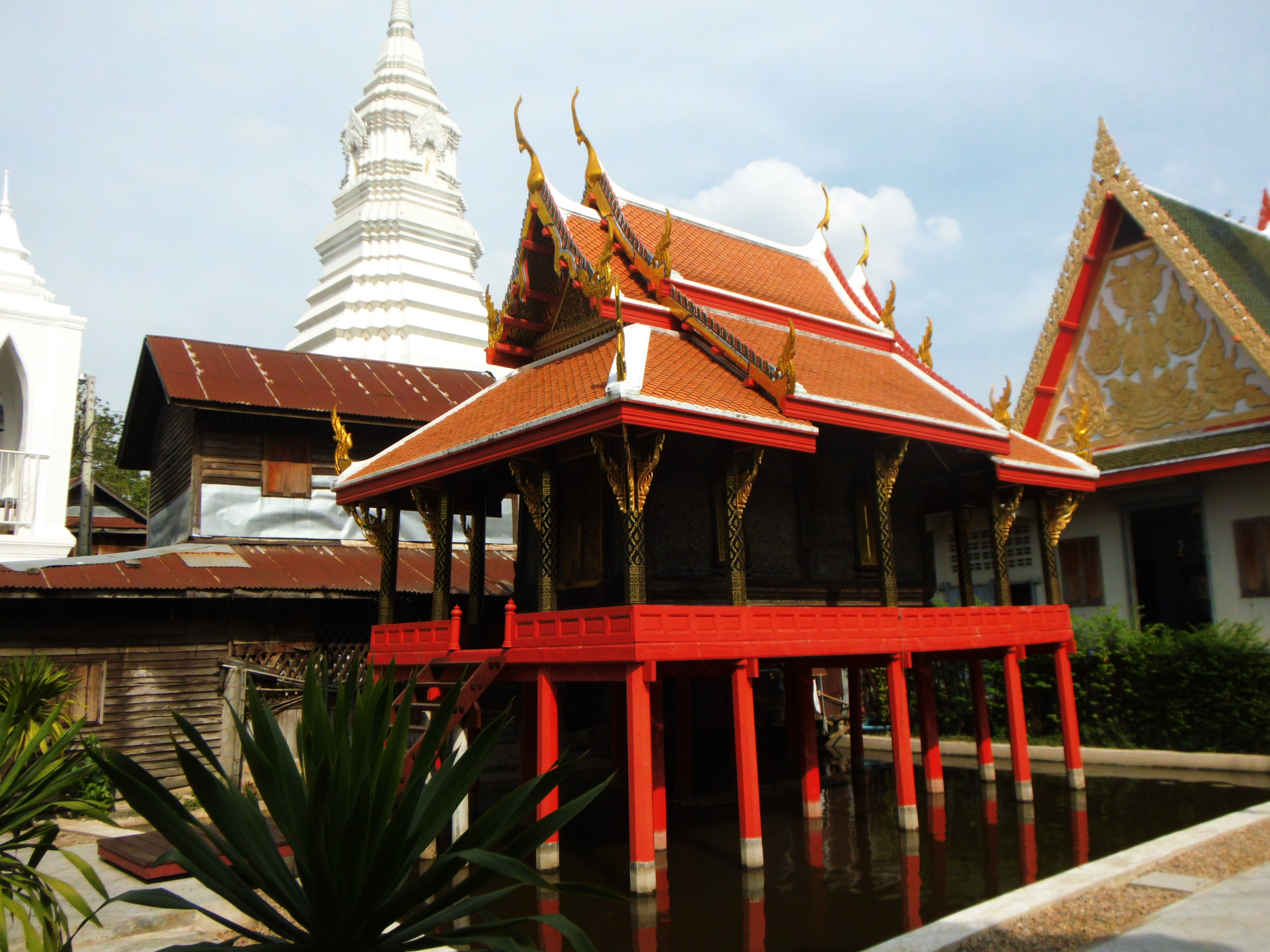
- The ancient ho trai

- Location within Bangkok

Religion
- Affiliation: Theravada (Maha Nikaya)
- Sect: Theravāda

Location
- Location: 174 Thoet Thai Rd., Pak Khlong Phasi Charoen, Phasi Charoen, Bangkok
- Country: Thailand
- Interactive map of Wat Apson Sawan
- Coordinates: 13.71988°N 100.469857°E

Architecture
- Founder: Chinese Wu

Wat Apson Sawan Worawihan (Thai: วัดอัปสรสวรรค์วรวิหาร), also simply known as Wat Apson Sawan is an ancient Thai Buddhist temple more than 200 years in Bangkok. It is situated rim canal Khlong Dan bounded by other temple were famed Wat Paknam Bhasicharoen, Wat Nang Chi, and across the canal is Wat Khun Chan in Talat Phlu quarter.

The temple is third classed royal monastery in Worawihan type. Formerly it was called Wat Mu (วัดหมู, "pig temple"), as it was built on the land of pig stable and the pigs were allowed to stroll in the compound, and was told that the temple was built by a Chinese named Wu (悟) without evidence of when it was created. Later on, during the reign of King Nangklao (Rama III), Royal Concubine Noi (Suranakong) has restored the temple. Later, King Nangklao ordered the temple renovated once again and bestowed the name "Wat Apson Sawan" ("temple of celestial apsara") to the temple.

What is interesting about this temple include ubosot (ordination hall) and vihāra (sanctuary) were built in Chinese style like neighbouring Wat Nang Chi. Enshrined inside ubosot are 28 in similar shape and size principal Buddha images in Māravijaya posture created by order of King Nangklao, as well as ho trai (Tripiṭaka hall) a whole wooden library built with Ayutthaya period art in the middle of a pond.

Wat Apson Sawan was declared a national historic site by the Fine Arts Department in 1977.

== Gallery ==
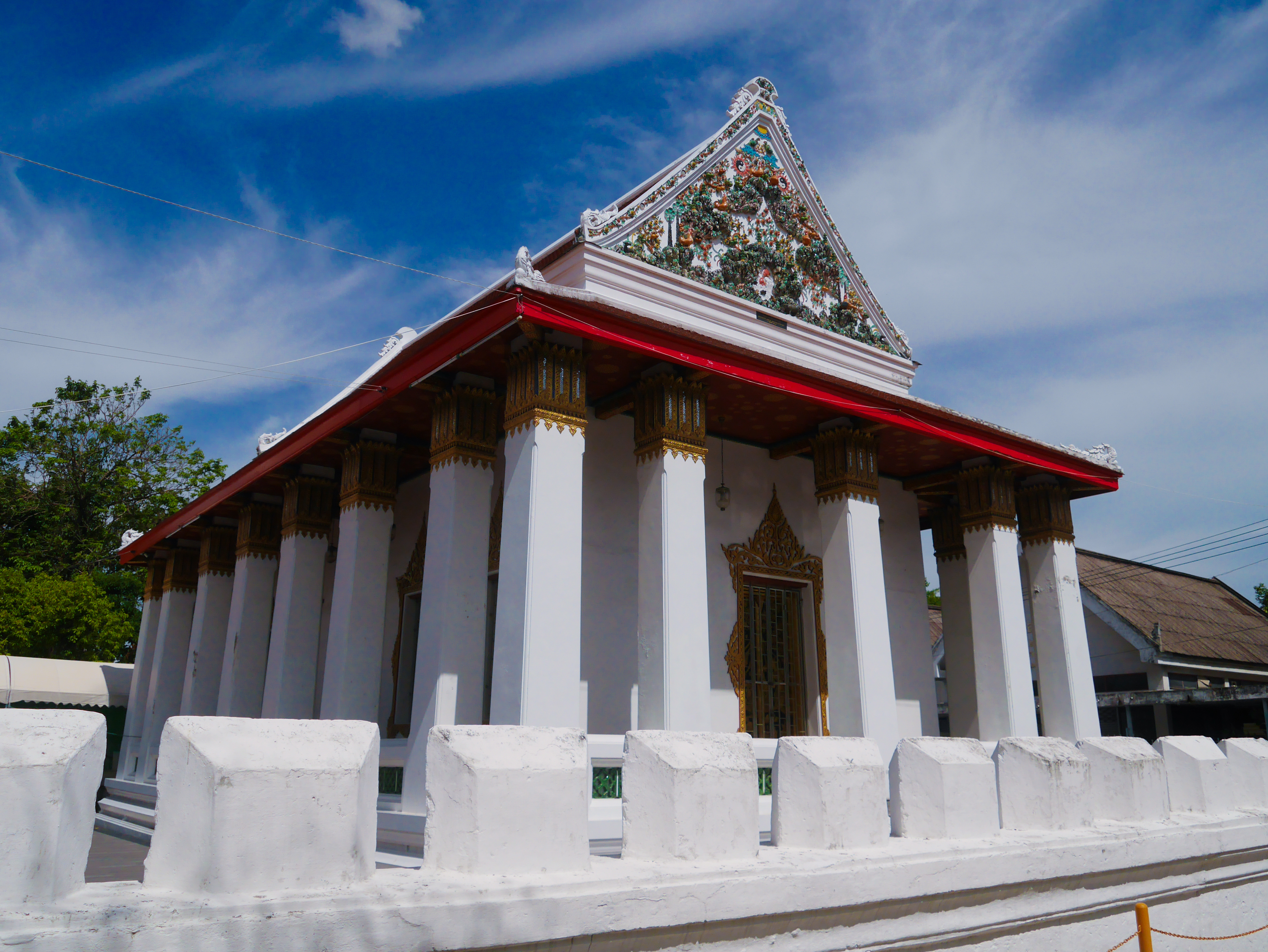
The ordination hall

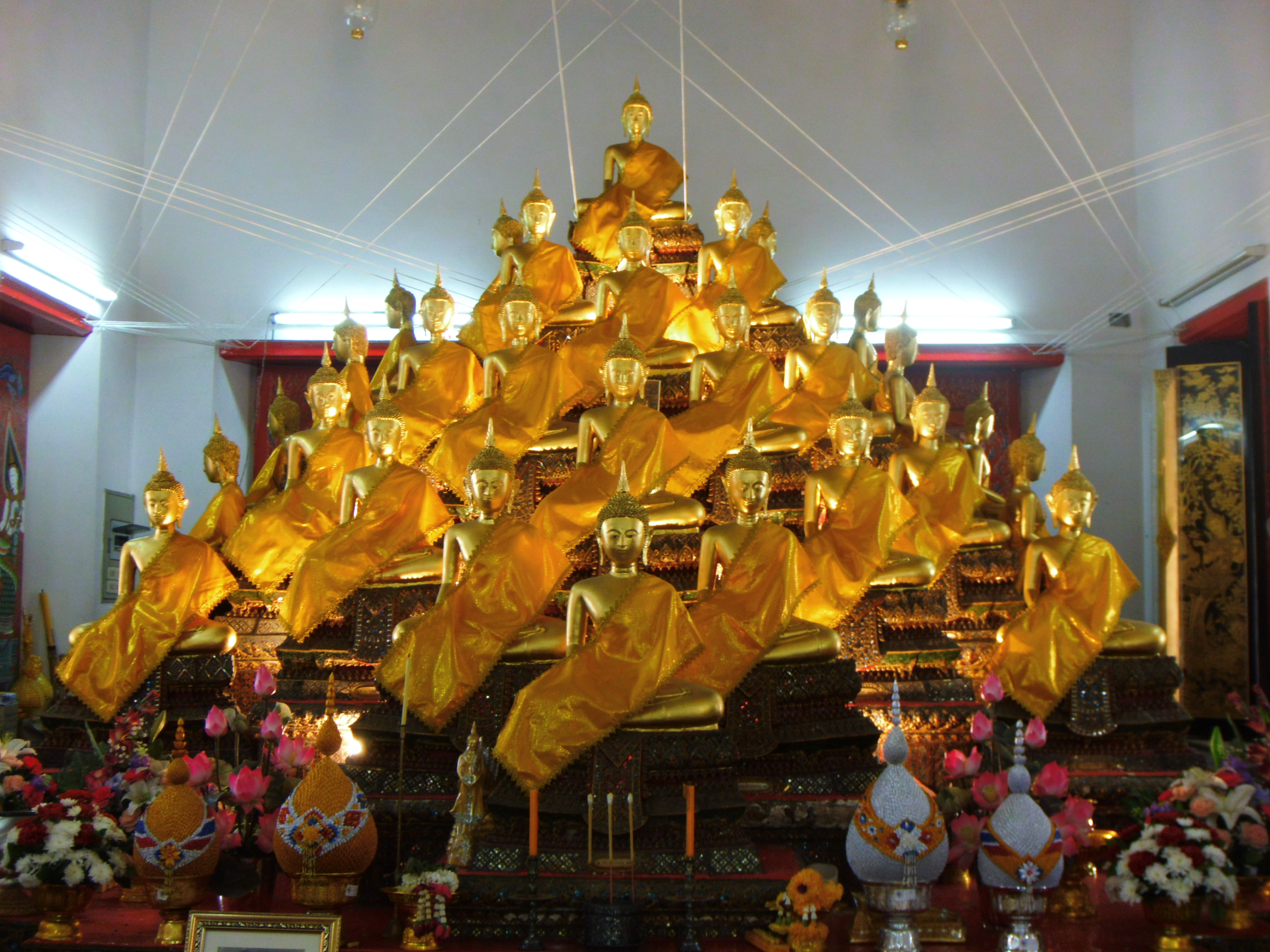
28 principal Buddha images

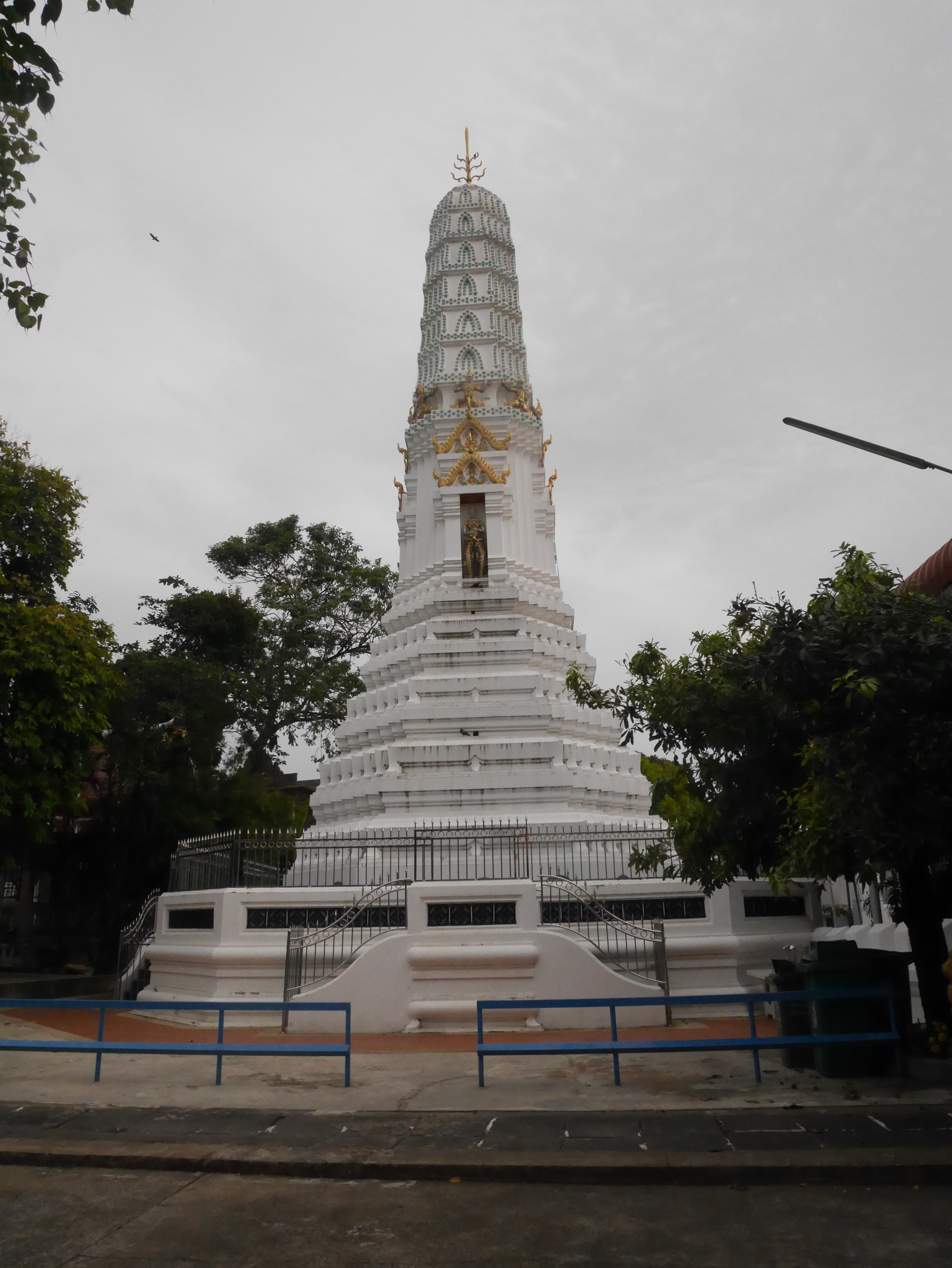
Stūpa
