= Ho trai =

Library of a Thai Buddhist temple

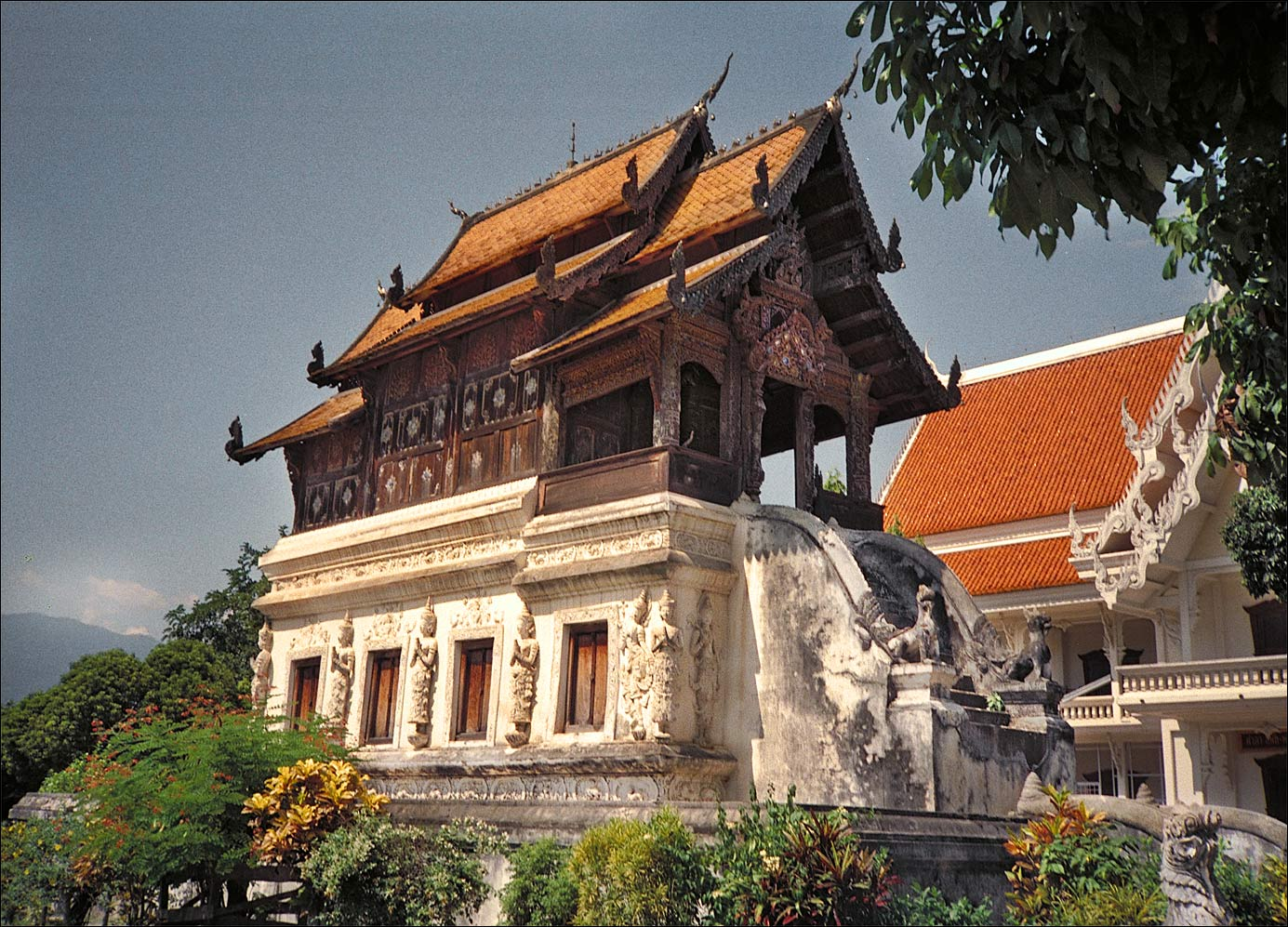
The ho trai of Wat Phra Singh in Chiang Mai

Ho trai (Thai: หอไตร) is Thai for scripture library. They most commonly refer to libraries of Thai Buddhist temples.

A ho trai can come in different shapes and sizes.

For many centuries, the sacred Tipiṭaka scriptures had been written on palm leaves. To preserve the scriptures against humidity and against termites, the library was often built on columns to raise the storage from the ground. Bricks were preferably used in constructions to battle termites. Sometimes the ho trai would be built, especially for this reason, above man-made ponds.

Traditionally, the Tipiṭaka scriptures consisted of individual palm leaves, each measuring around 50 centimetres (20 in) in length and around 4 to 6 centimetres (1.6 to 2.4 in) in width. They were perforated and threaded in order to combine them in stacks of 20 to 40 pages. These stacks are kept pressed between two pieces of teakwood which is then wrapped in cloth and stored in a special bookcase. These bookcases are sometimes exquisitely crafted with mother-of-pearl inlay or with gold leaf applied on black lacquer. Beautiful examples of bookcases can be seen in the Bangkok National Museum. Modern Tipiṭaka are now printed as books.

== Gallery ==
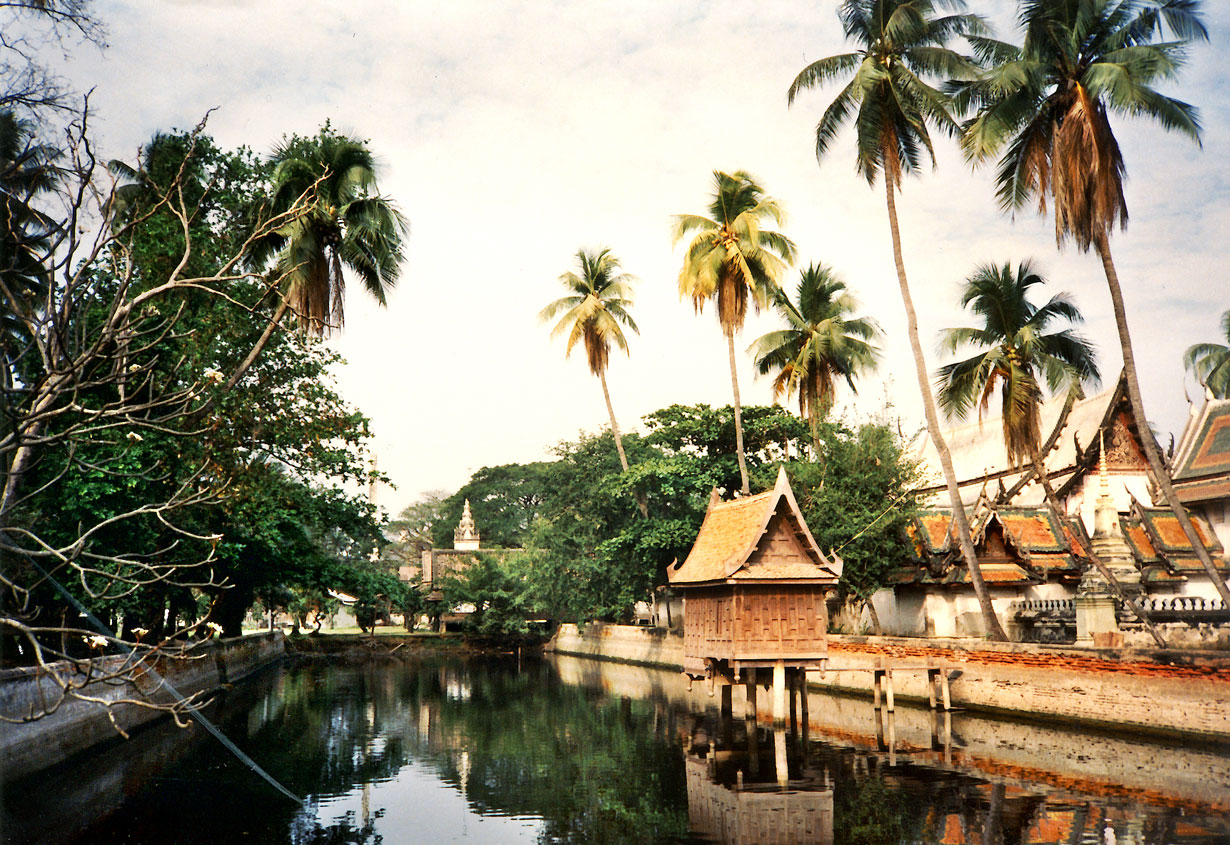
The Ho trai of Wat Yai Suwannaram in Phetchaburi built above a pond

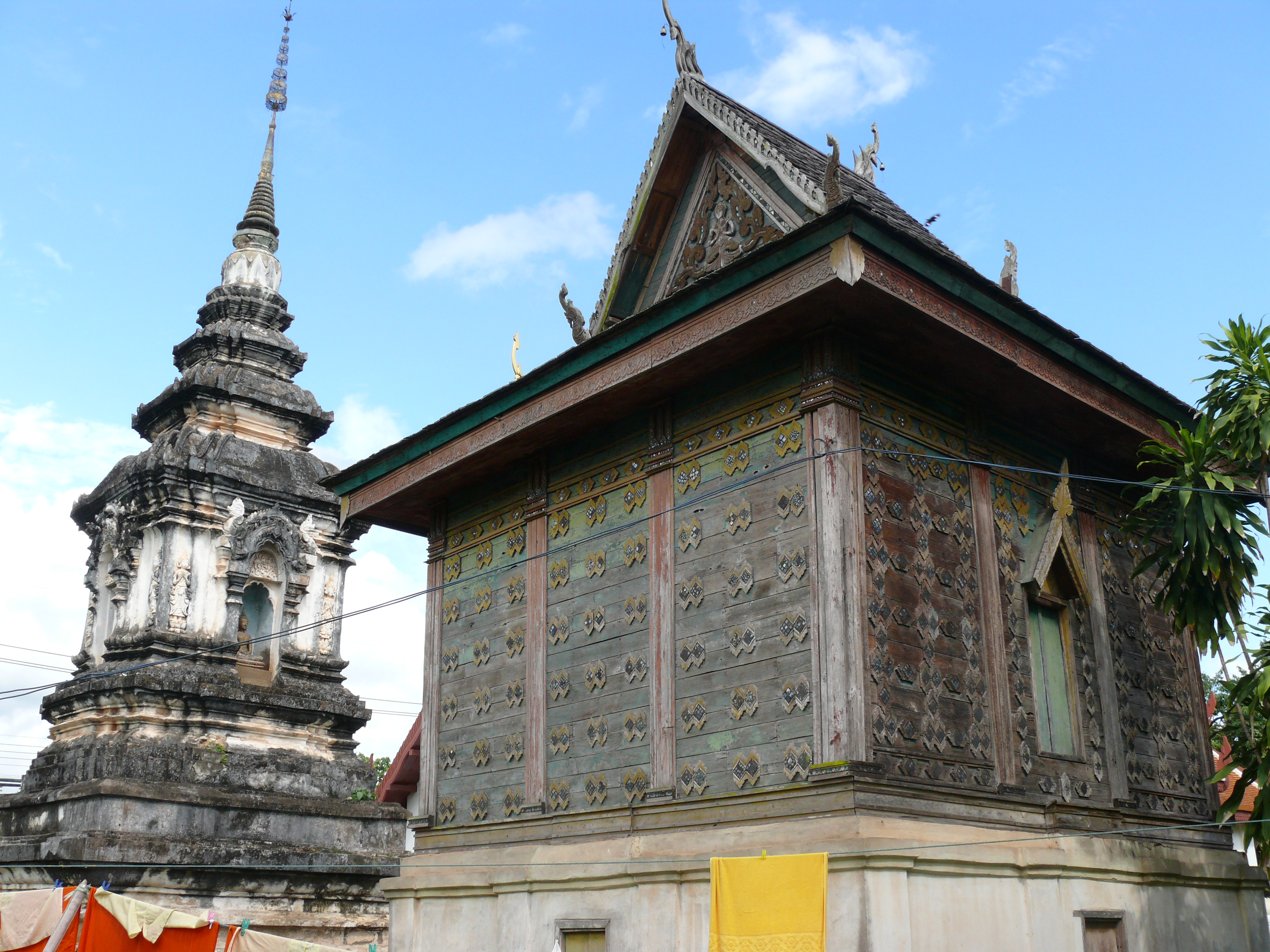
The Ho trai of Wat Hua Khuang in Nan

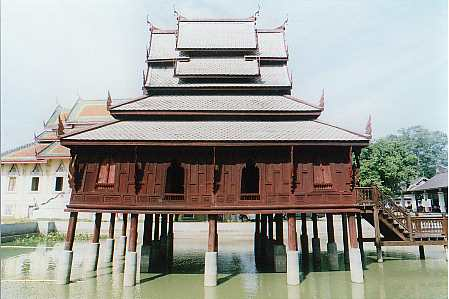
The Ho trai of Wat Tung Sri Muang in Ubon Ratchathani

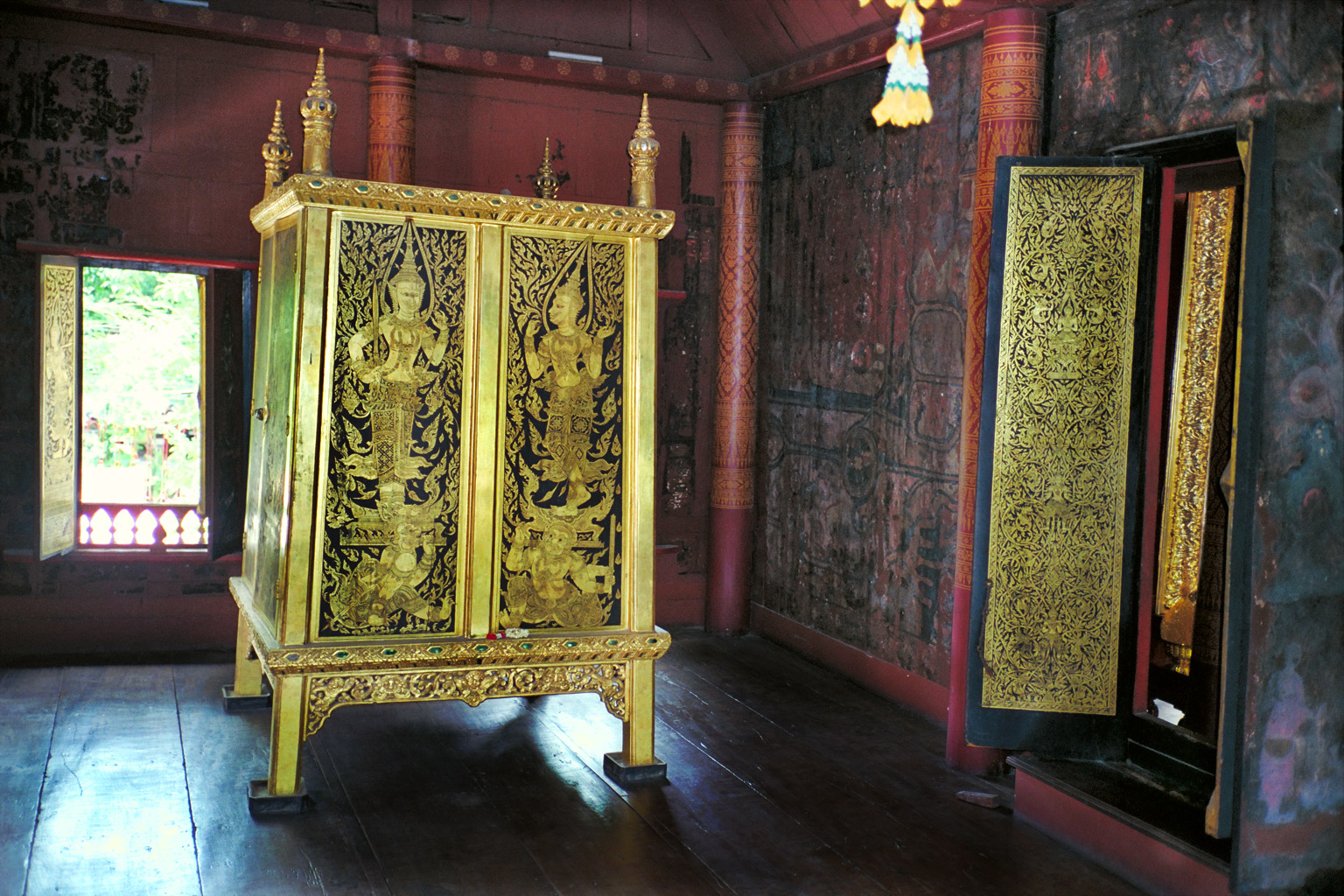
The interior of the Ho trai of Wat Rakhang, Khet Bangkok Noi, Bangkok

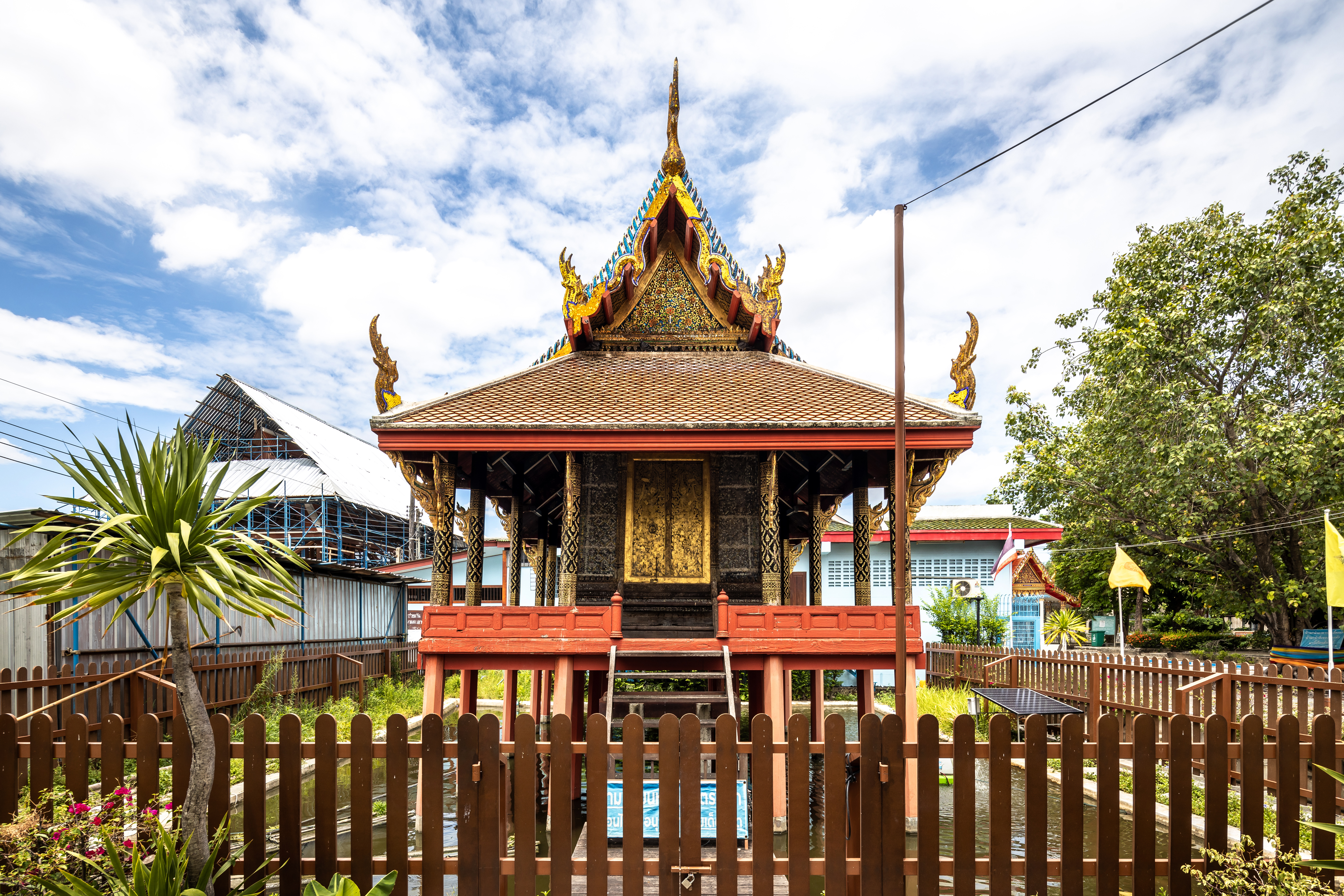
The "Ho trai" of Wat Apson Sawan, khet Phasi Charoen, Bangkok

== See also ==
- Dhamma Society Fund
- Pitakataik
- Pitakataik (Bagan)
- Pitakataik (Mandalay)
