= Palm-leaf manuscript =

Manuscripts made out of dried palm leaves

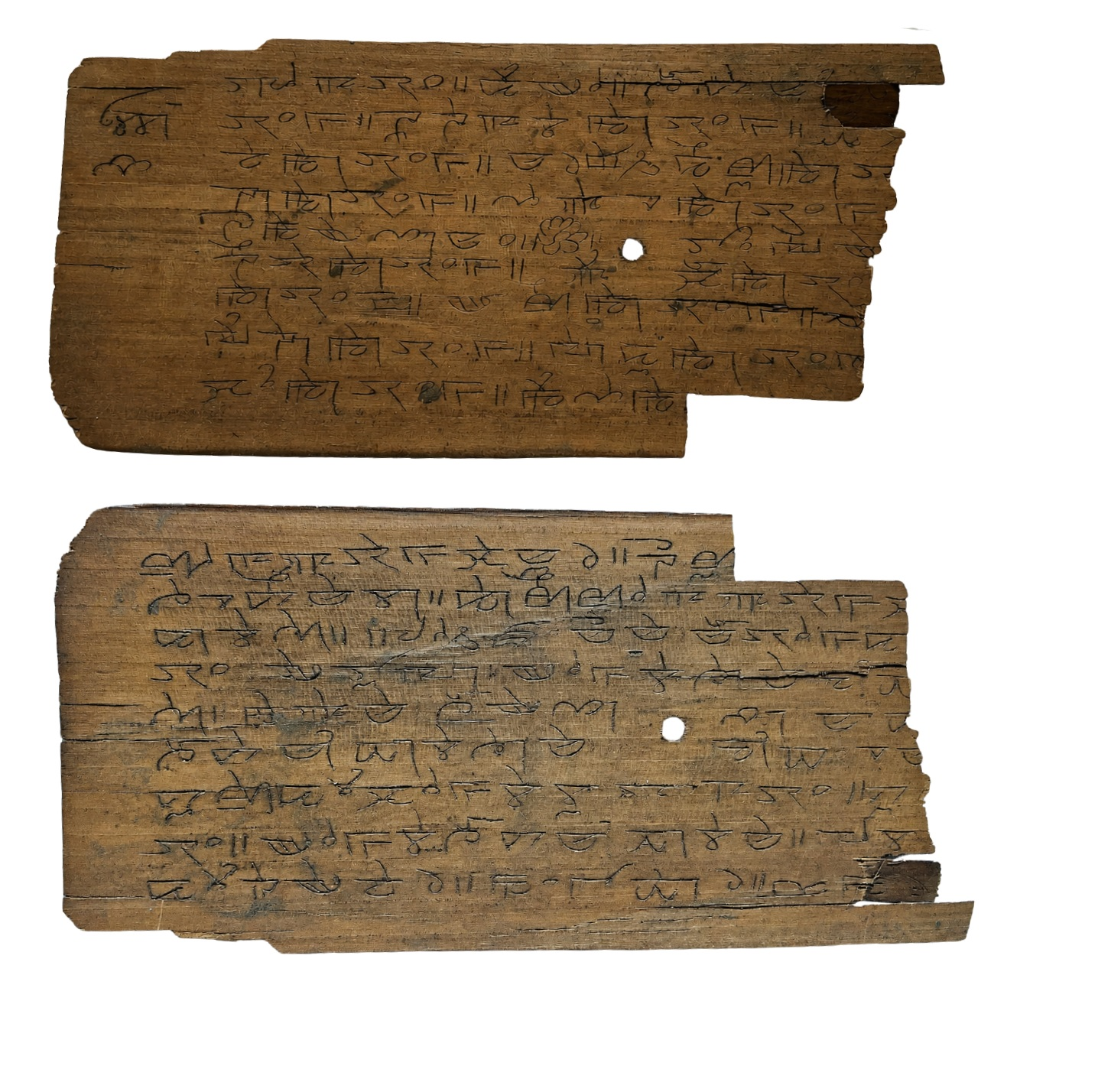
An Ancient Meitei language palm leaf manuscript text, in traditional Meetei Mayek script

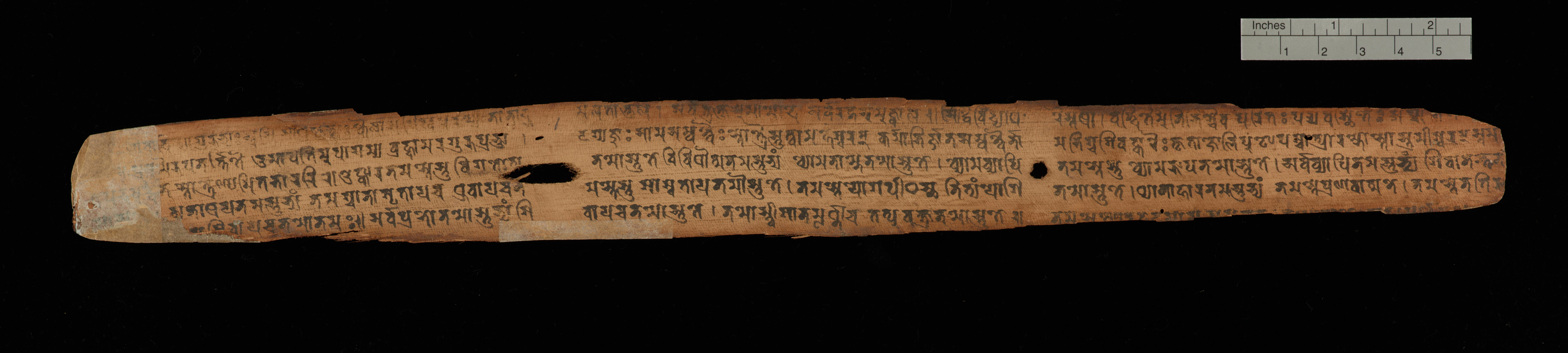
This palm-leaf manuscript from Nepal, which is one of the oldest known dated Sanskrit manuscripts, is a copy of the Pārameśvaratantra, a scripture related to Shaiva Siddhanta, which claims Shiva to be Pārameśvara. A note in the manuscript states that it was copied in the year 252, which some scholars judge to be of the era established by the Nepalese king Amśuvaran, corresponding to 828 CE. Cambridge University Library

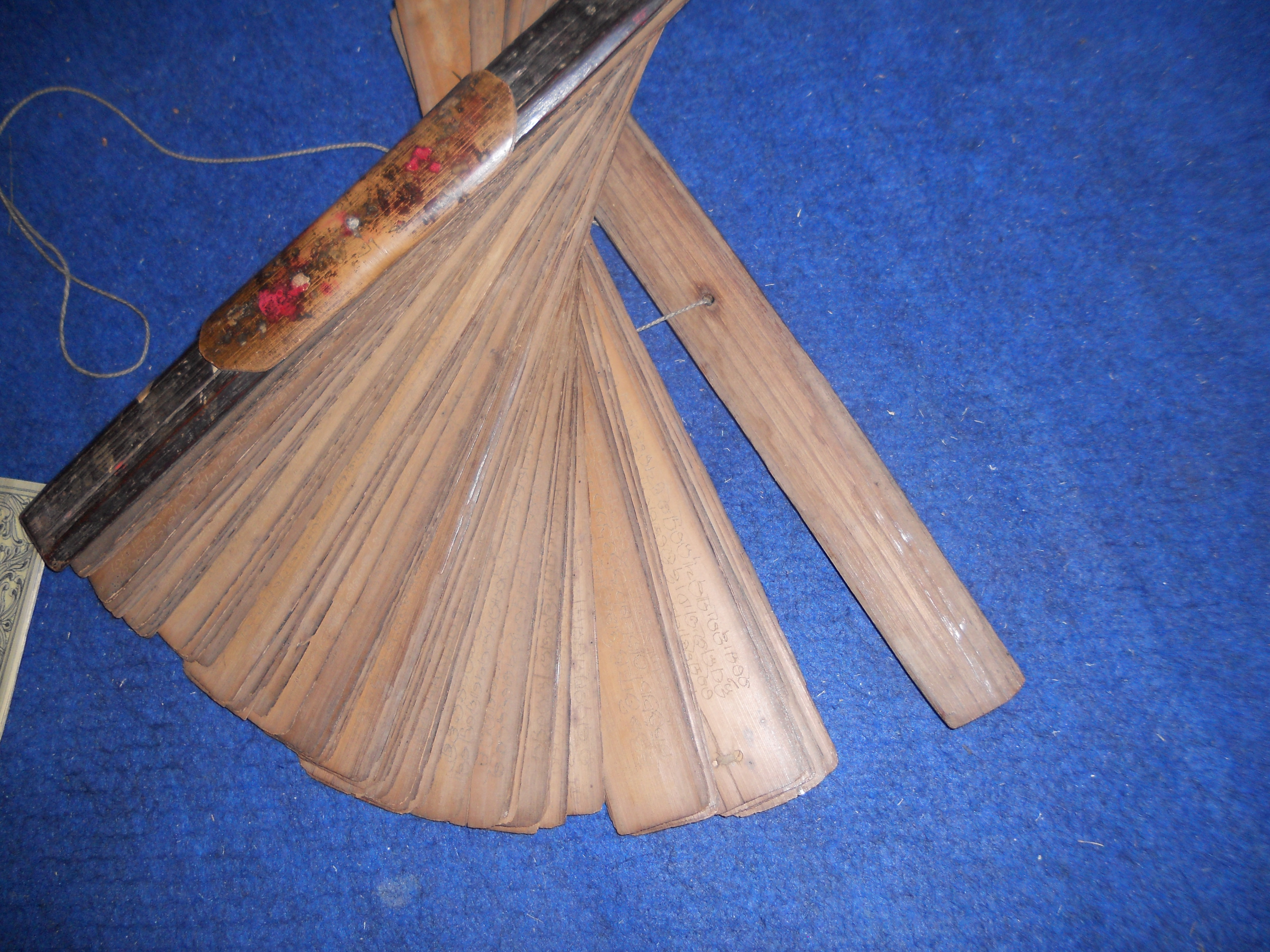
16th-century palm leaf manuscripts in Odia script

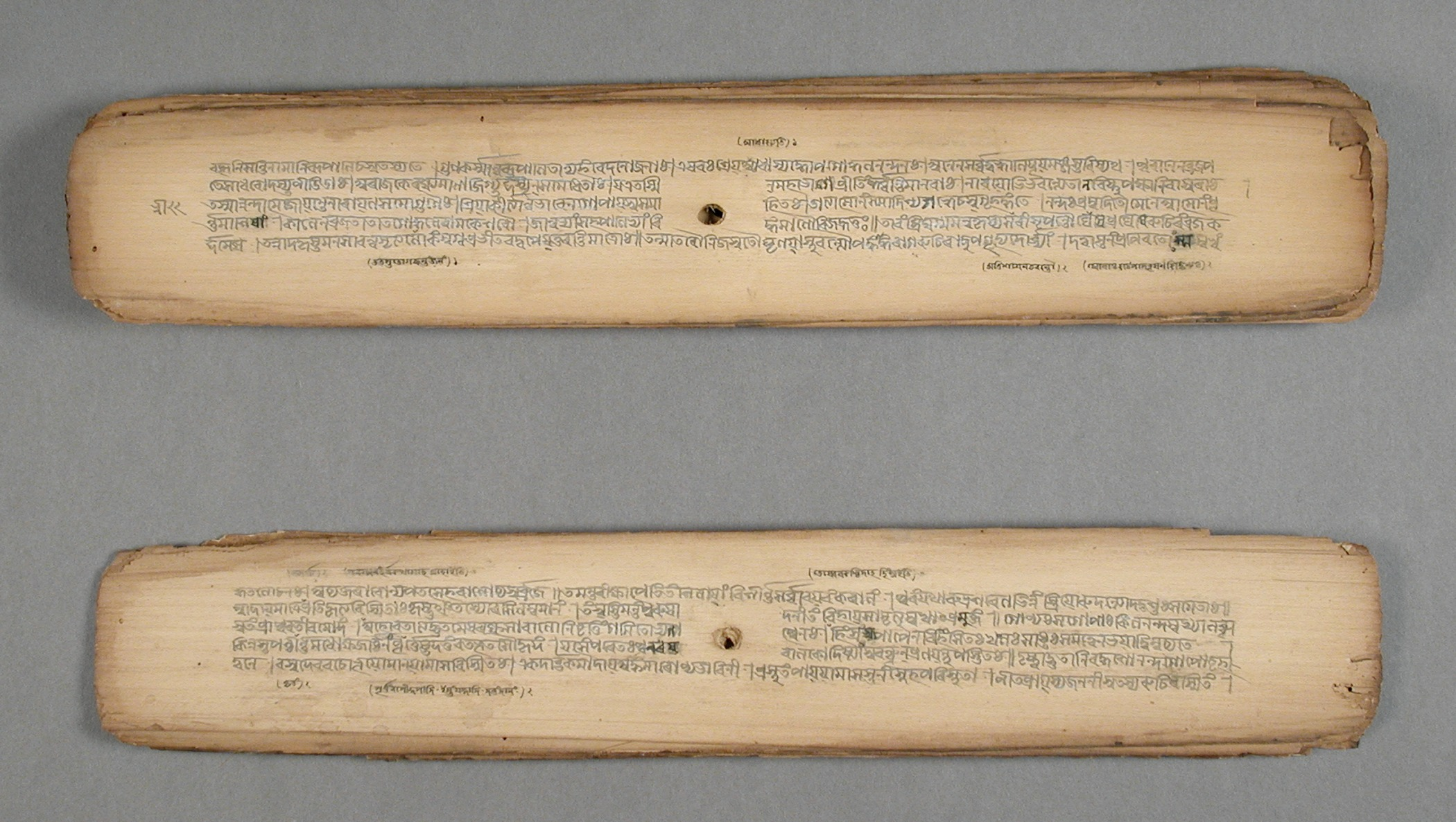
16th-century Hindu Bhagavata Purana on palm leaf manuscript

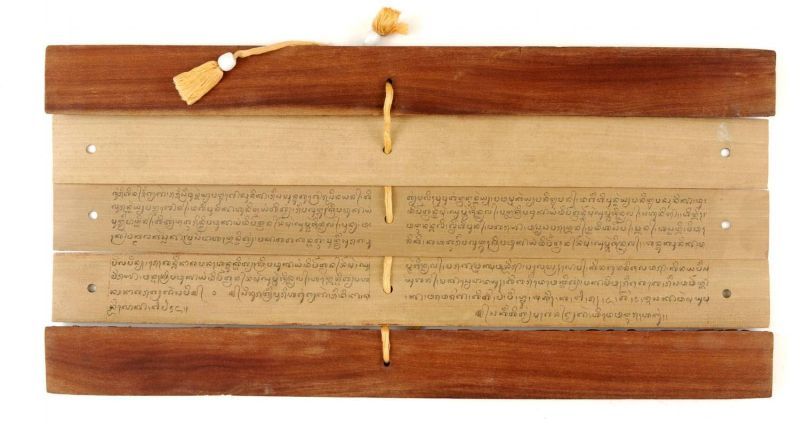
A palm leaf Hindu text manuscript (Lontara) from Bali, Indonesia, showing how the manuscripts were tied into a book.

Palm leaves were used as writing material in the Indian subcontinent as early as the 5th century BCE. Their use began in Nepal and India and spread to other regions, such as Sri Lanka and Southeast Asia, in the form of dried and smoke-treated Palmyra or talipot palm leaves. Their use continued until the 19th century when the printing press replaced hand-written manuscripts.

One of the oldest surviving complete palm leaf manuscripts is a Sanskrit Shaivism text from the 9th century, discovered in Nepal, and now preserved at the Cambridge University Library. The Spitzer Manuscript is a collection of palm leaf fragments found in Kizil Caves, China. They are dated to around the 2nd century CE and is in Buddhist hybrid Sanskrit.

== History ==
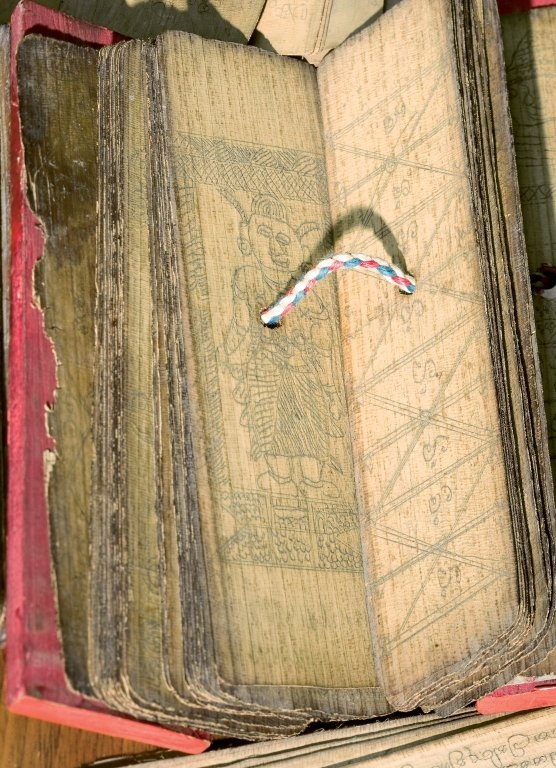
A medical manuscript in Sinhala, c. 1700

The text in palm leaf manuscripts was inscribed with a knife pen on rectangular cut and cured palm leaf sheets; colourings were then applied to the surface and wiped off, leaving the ink in the incised grooves. Typically, each sheet had a hole through which a string could pass, and using these holes, the sheets were bound together like a book by tying them together with a string. Such palm leaf texts typically had a lifespan of between a few decades and roughly 600 years before they started to rot due to moisture, insect activity, mould, and fragility. Thus the document had to be copied onto new sets of dried palm leaves. The oldest surviving palm leaf Indian manuscripts have been found in colder, drier climates such as in parts of Nepal, Tibet, and central Asia, the source of 1st-millennium CE manuscripts.

The individual sheets of palm leaves were called Patra or Parna in Sanskrit (Pali/Prakrit: Panna), and the medium when ready to write was called Tada-patra (or Tala-patra, Tali, Tadi). The famous 5th-century CE Indian manuscript called the Bower Manuscript discovered in Chinese Turkestan, was written on birch-bark sheets shaped in the form of treated palm leaves.

Hindu temples often served as centers where ancient manuscripts were routinely used for learning and where the texts were copied when they wore out. In South India, temples and associated mutts served custodial functions, and a large number of manuscripts on Hindu philosophy, poetry, grammar, and other subjects were written, multiplied, and preserved inside the temples. Archaeological and epigraphical evidence indicates the existence of libraries called Sarasvati-bhandara, dated possibly to the early 12th century and employing librarians, attached to Hindu temples. Palm-leaf manuscripts were also preserved inside Jain temples and in Buddhist monasteries.

With the spread of Indian culture to Southeast Asian countries like as Indonesia, Cambodia, Thailand, Laos, and the Philippines, these nations also became home to large collections. Palm-leaf manuscripts called Lontar in dedicated stone libraries have been discovered by archaeologists at Hindu temples in Bali (Indonesia) and in 10th century Cambodian temples such as Angkor Wat and Banteay Srei.

One of the oldest surviving Sanskrit manuscripts on palm leaves is of the Parameshvaratantra, a Shaiva Siddhanta text of Hinduism. It is from the 9th century, and dated to about 828 CE. The discovered palm-leaf collection also includes a few parts of another text, the Jñānārṇavamahātantra, currently held by the University of Cambridge.

With the introduction of printing in the early 19th century, the cycle of copying from palm leaves mostly came to an end. Many governments are making efforts to preserve what is left of their palm-leaf documents.

== Relationship with the development of writing systems ==
The round and cursive design of the letters of many Brahmic scripts such as Devanagari, Nandinagari, Kannada, Telugu, Lontara, Javanese, Balinese, Odia, Burmese, Tamil, Khmer, Malayalam, and so forth, may be an adaptation to the use of palm leaves, as angular letters could tear the leaves apart.

== Regional variations ==
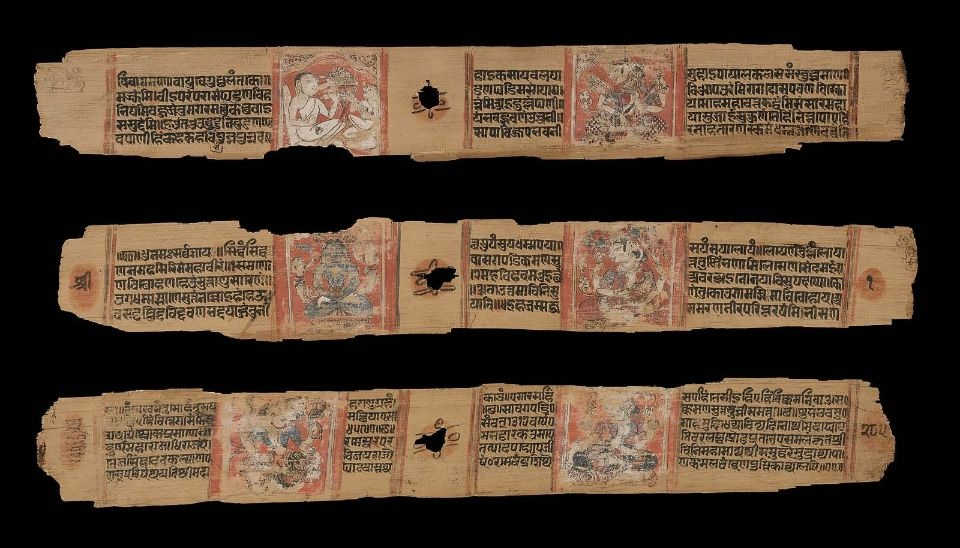
A Jain palm leaf manuscript from Rajasthan

=== Cambodia ===
Palm-leaf manuscripts or sleuk rith as they are known in the Khmer language, can be found in Cambodia since Angkorian times as can be seen from at least one bas-relief on the walls of Angkor Wat. While they were of major importance until the 20th century, French archeologist Olivier de Bernon estimated that about 90% of all the sleuk rith were lost in the turmoil of the Cambodian Civil War while new supports such as codex books or digital media took over. Since then, conservation efforts have been made in pagodas such as at Wat Ounalom in Phnom Penh.

=== India ===
In the city of Thanjavur in India, priceless palm-leaf manuscripts are preserved. The Saraswathi Mahal Library, established around year 1700 and located in the premises of the palace, contains over 30,000 Indian and European manuscripts written on palm leaf and paper. Over eighty per cent of its manuscripts are in Sanskrit and many of them are on palm leaves.

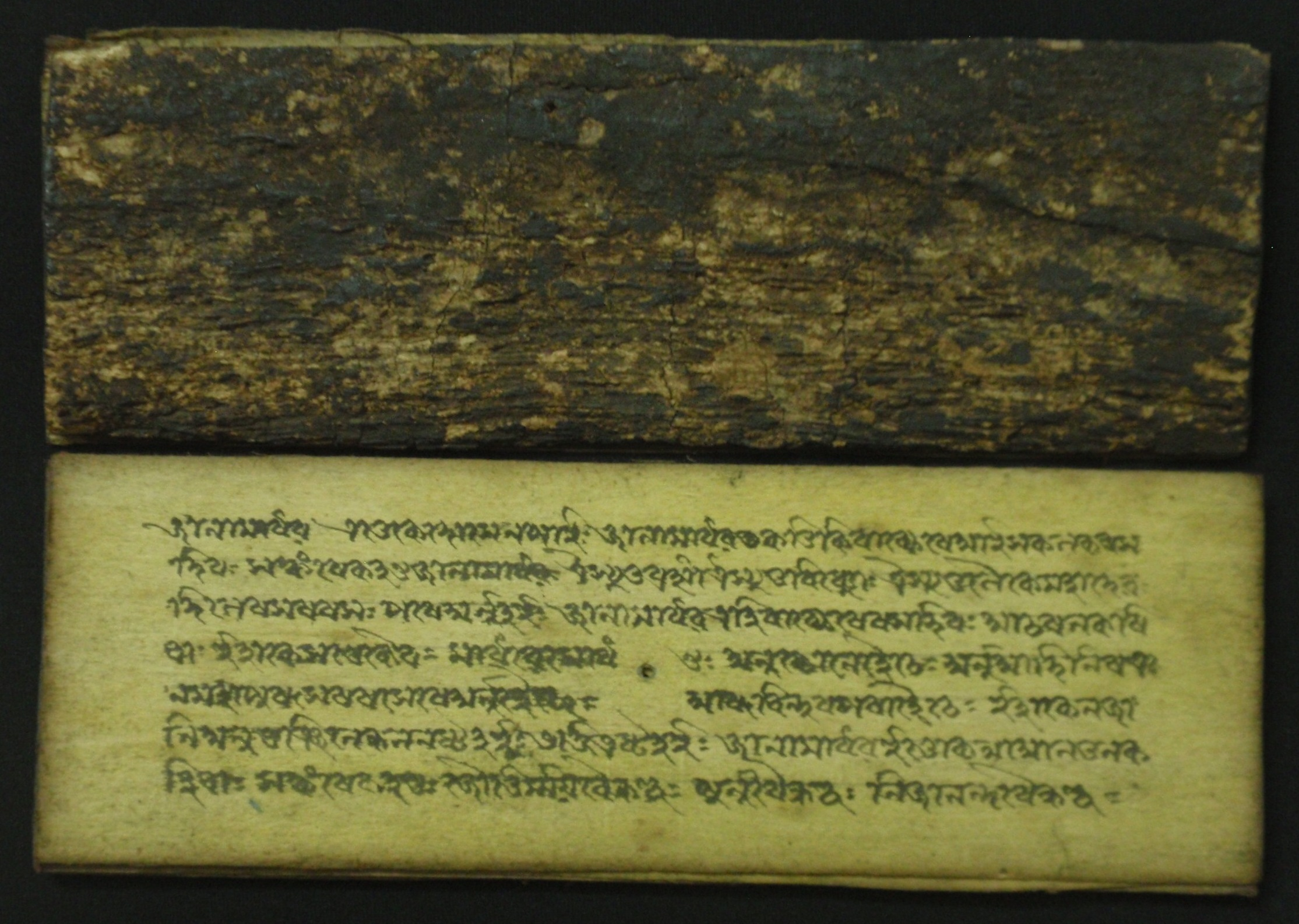
Sanchipat, from Assam

==== Assam ====
Assam has a related tradition of agarwood-bark strung manuscripts since the 7th century, called sanchipat. The strips of bark are cut in similar dimensions to other Indian pothi, and strung accordingly. Sanchipat are uniquely resilient in the humid, tropical climate of Assam; it is prepared with toxic materials that make it anti-fungal and pest-resistant.

==== Odisha ====
Palm leaf manuscripts of Odisha include scriptures, pictures of Devadasi, and various mudras of the Kama Sutra. Some of the early discoveries of Odia palm leaf manuscripts include writings like Smaradipika, Ratimanjari, Pancasayaka, and Anangaranga in both Odia and Sanskrit. The State Museum of Odisha at Bhubaneswar houses 40,000 palm leaf manuscripts. Most of them are written in the Odia script, though the language is Sanskrit. The oldest manuscript here belongs to the 14th century but the text can be dated to the 2nd century.

==== Kerala ====
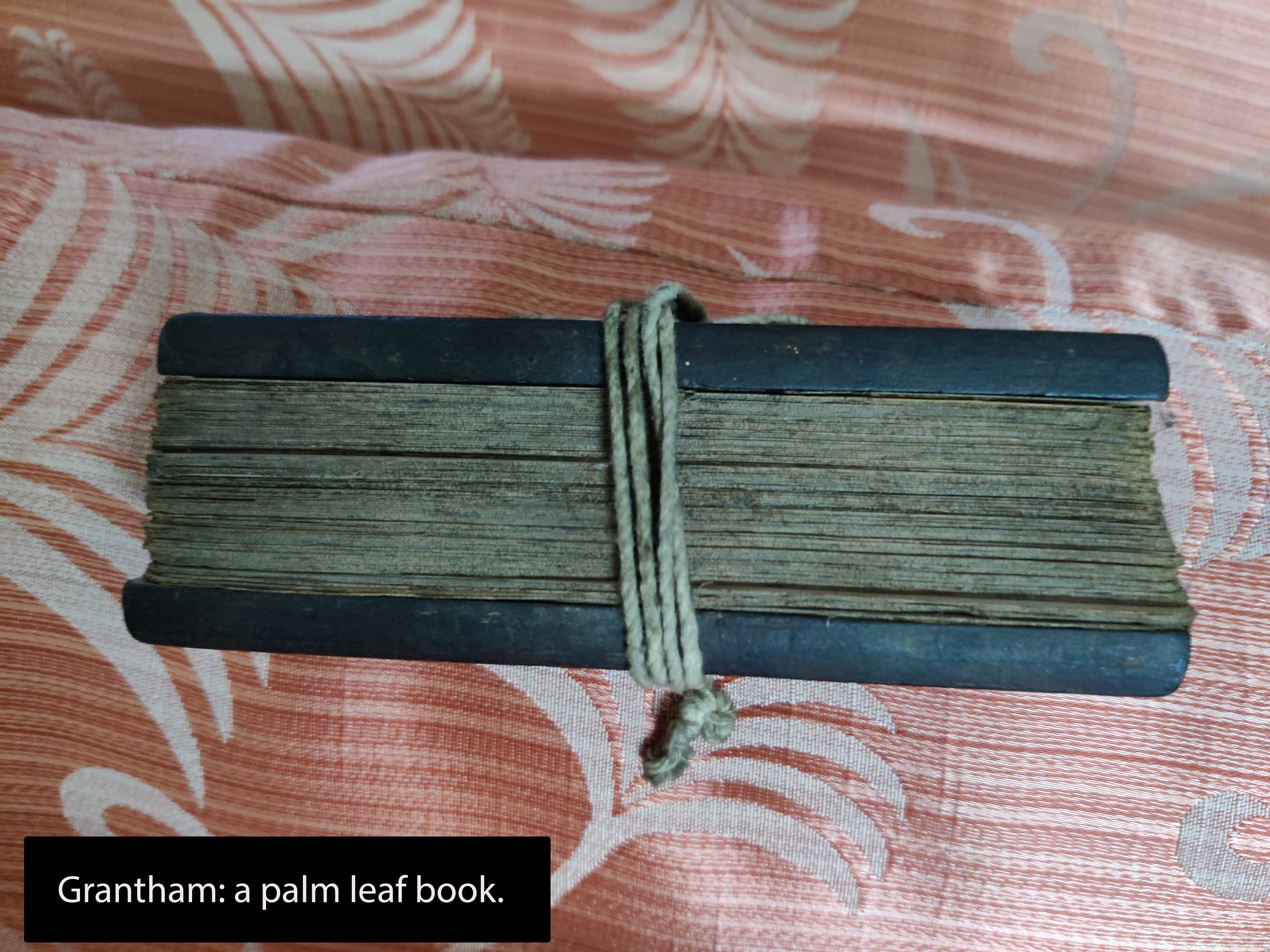
Palm leaf manuscript

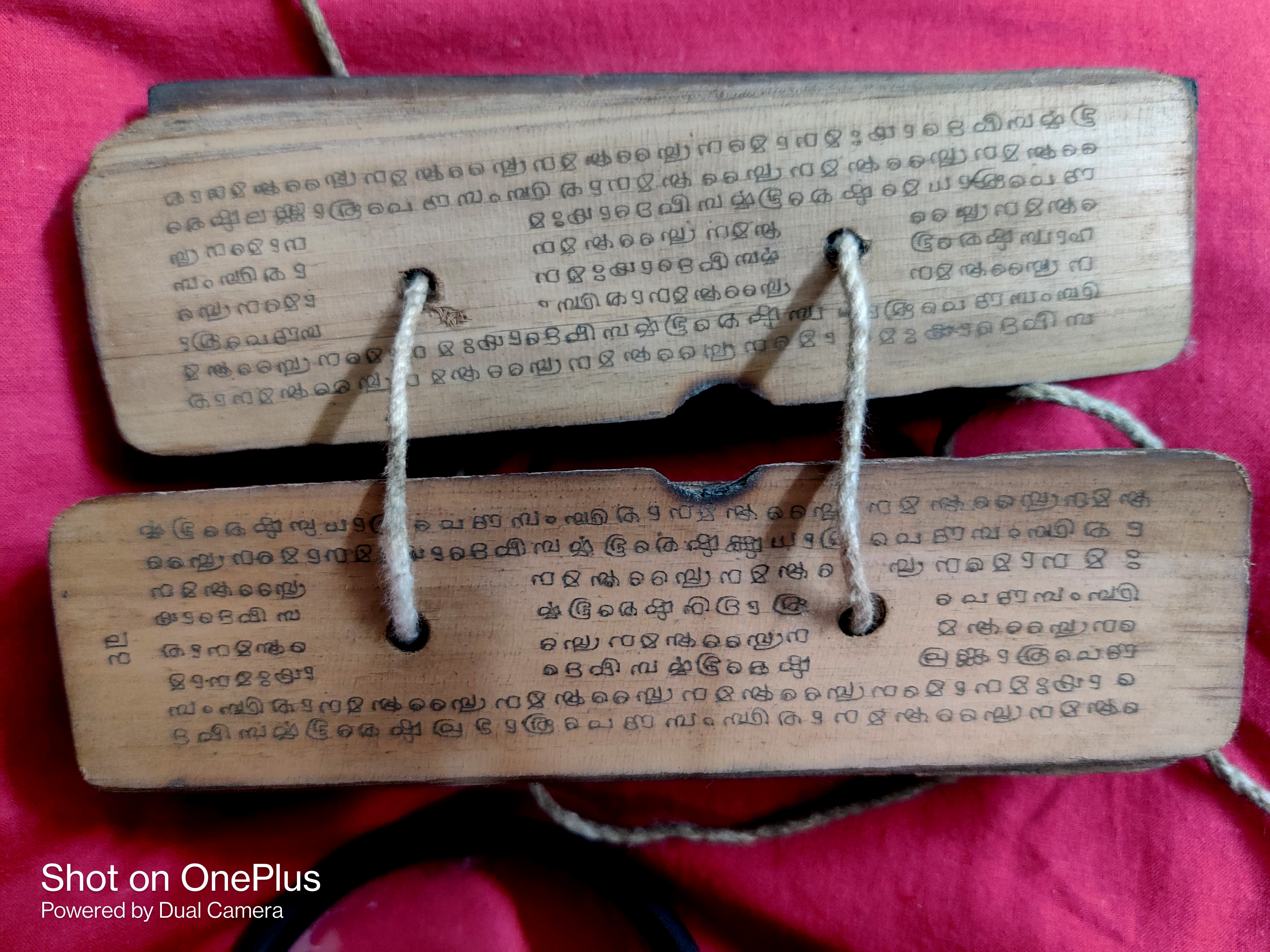
Palm leaf manuscript

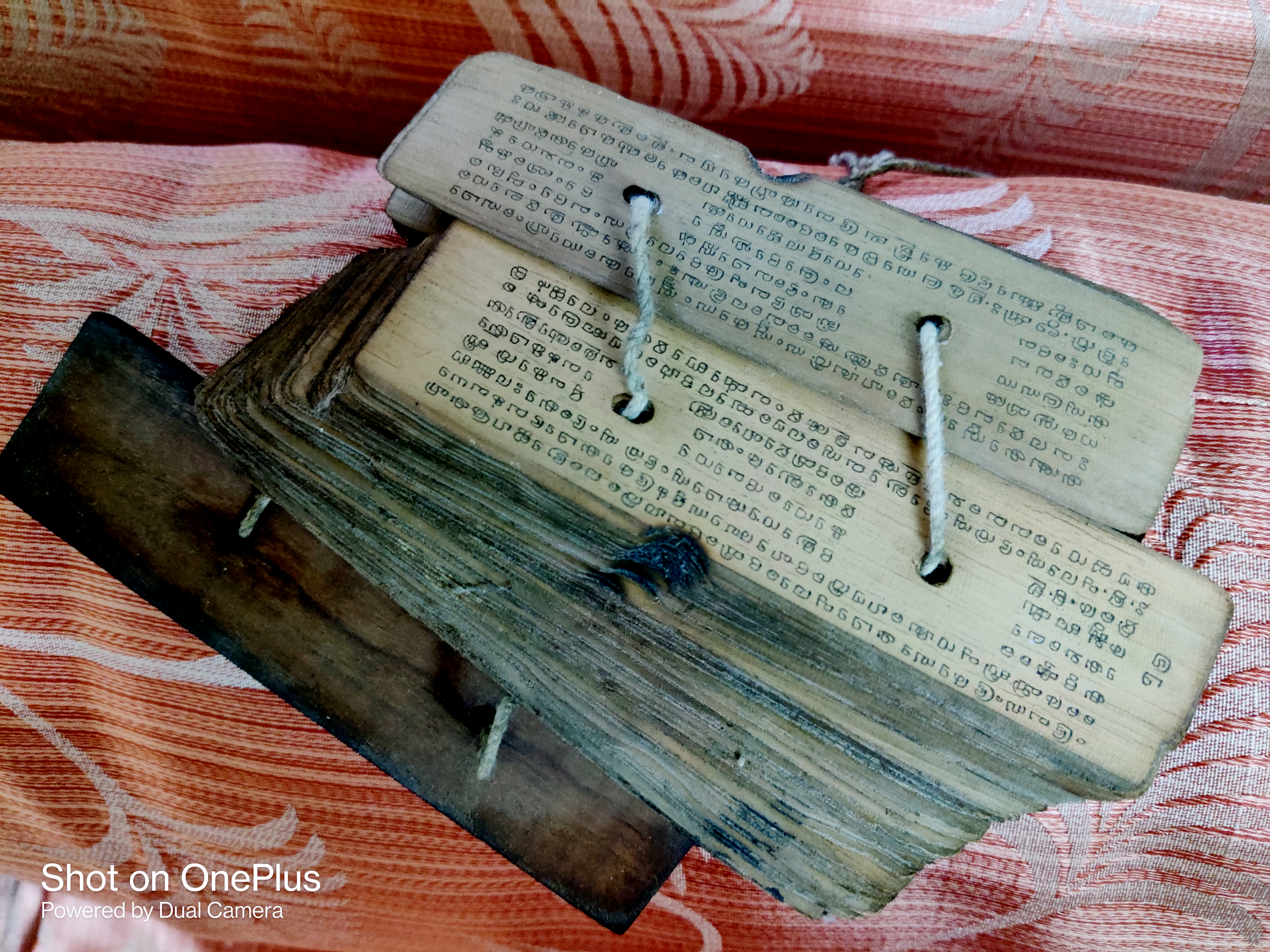
Palm leaf manuscript

==== Tamil Nadu ====
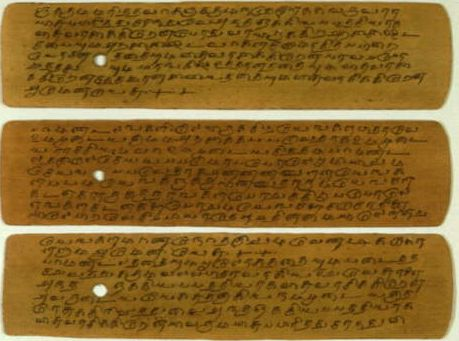
16th-century Christian prayers in Tamil, on palm leaf manuscripts

In 1997 The United Nations Educational Scientific and Cultural Organisation (UNESCO) recognised the Tamil Medical Manuscript Collection as part of the Memory of the World Register. A very good example of the usage of palm leaf manuscripts to store history is a Tamil grammar book named Tolkāppiyam, written around the 3rd century BCE. A global digitalization project led by the Tamil Heritage Foundation collects, preserves, digitizes, and makes ancient palm-leaf manuscript documents available to users via the internet.

=== Indonesia ===
In Indonesia, the palm-leaf manuscript is called lontar. The Indonesian word is the modern form of Old Javanese rontal. It is composed of two Old Javanese words, namely ron "leaf" and tal "Borassus flabellifer, palmyra palm". Due to the shape of the Palmyra palm's leaves, which are spread like a fan, these trees are also known as "fan trees". The leaves of the rontal tree have always been used for many purposes, such as for the making of plaited mats, palm sugar wrappers, water scoops, ornaments, ritual tools, and writing material. Today, the art of writing in rontal still survives in Bali, performed by Balinese Brahmin as a sacred duty to rewrite Hindu texts.

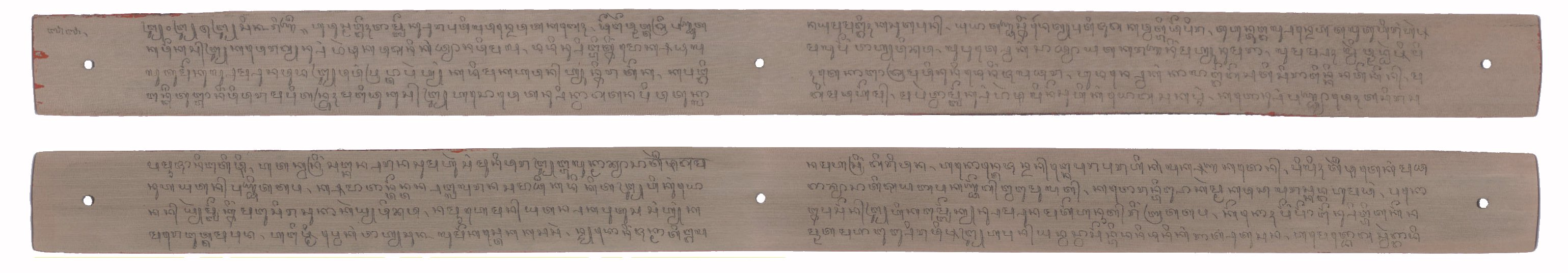
Balinese palm-leaf manuscript of Kakawin Arjunawiwāha

Many old manuscripts dated from ancient Java, Indonesia, were written on rontal palm-leaf manuscripts. Manuscripts dated from the 14th to 15th century during the Majapahit period. Some were found even earlier, like the Arjunawiwaha, the Smaradahana, the Nagarakretagama, and the Kakawin Sutasoma, which were discovered on the neighboring islands of Bali and Lombok. This suggested that the tradition of preserving, copying, and rewriting palm-leaf manuscripts continued for centuries. Other palm-leaf manuscripts include Sundanese language works: the Carita Parahyangan, the Sanghyang Siksa Kandang Karesian, and the Bujangga Manik.

=== Myanmar (Burma) ===
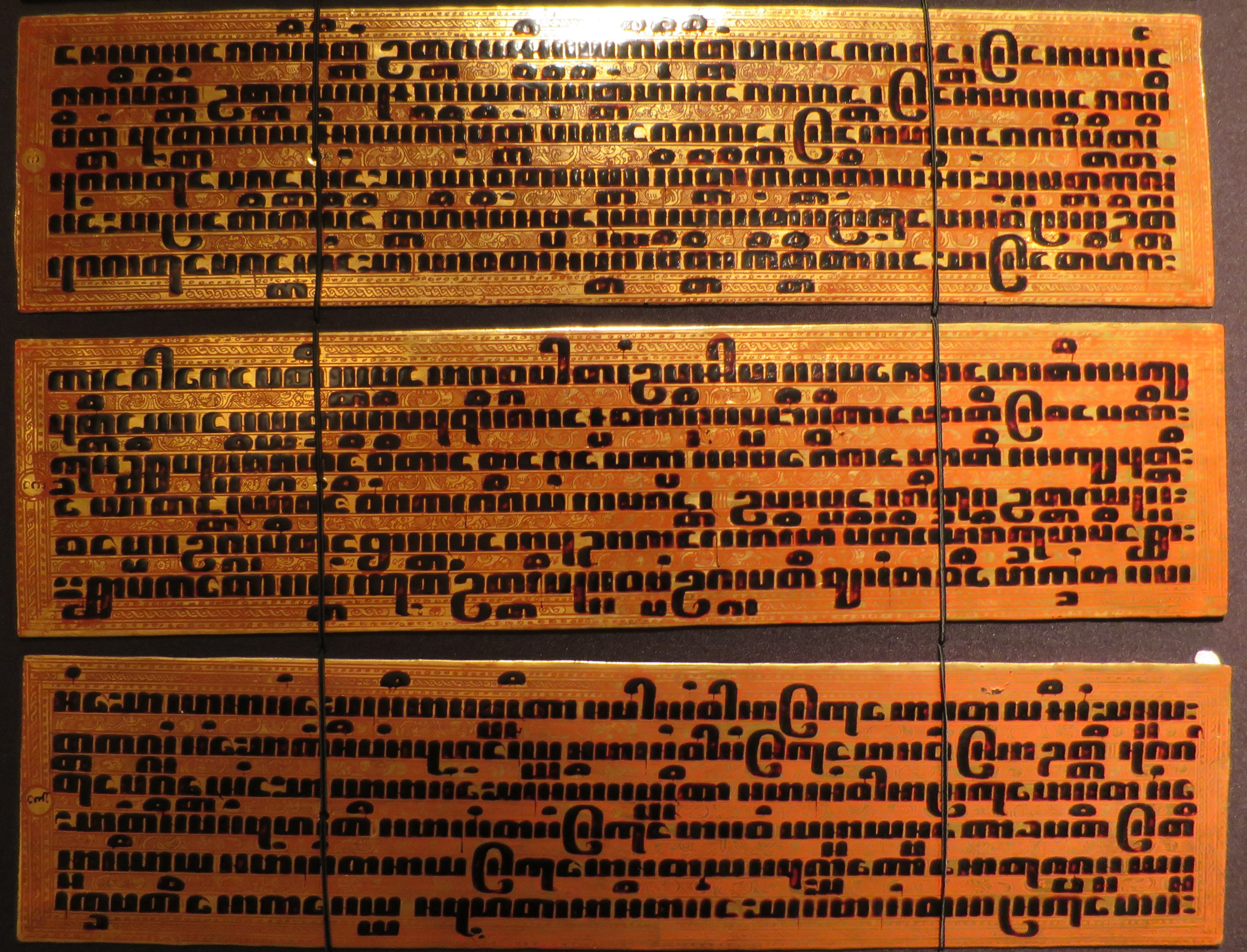
A 19th-century palm-leaf manuscript called kammawa from Bagan, Myanmar

In Myanmar, the palm-leaf manuscript is called pesa (ပေစာ). In the pre-colonial era, along with folding-book manuscripts, pesa was a primary medium of transcribing texts, including religious scriptures, and administrative and juridical records. The use of pesa dates back to 12th century Bagan, but the majority of existent pesa date to the 1700-1800s. Key historical sources, including Burmese chronicles, were first originally recorded using pesa. The Burmese word for "literature", sape (စာပေ) is derived from the word pesa.

In the 17th century, decorated palm leaf manuscripts called kammavācā or kammawasa (ကမ္မဝါစာ) emerged. The earliest such manuscript dates to 1683. These decorated manuscripts include ornamental motifs and are inscribed with ink on lacquered palm leaves gilded with gold leaf. Akasayavaca manuscripts are written using a tamarind-seed typeface similar to the style used in Burmese stone inscriptions. Palm-leaf manuscripts continued to be produced in the country well into the 20th century.

The Universities' Central Library in Yangon houses the country's largest collection of traditional manuscripts, including 15,000 pesa. In February 2013, the Pali Text Society, Sendai University, and the University of Toronto, along with local partners, began an ongoing initiative to digitise and catalogue Myanmar's palm-leaf manuscripts, including collections from U Pho Thi Library in Thaton, and Bagaya Monastery in Inwa. The digitised manuscripts are available at the open-access Myanmar Manuscript Digital Library.

== Preparation and preservation ==
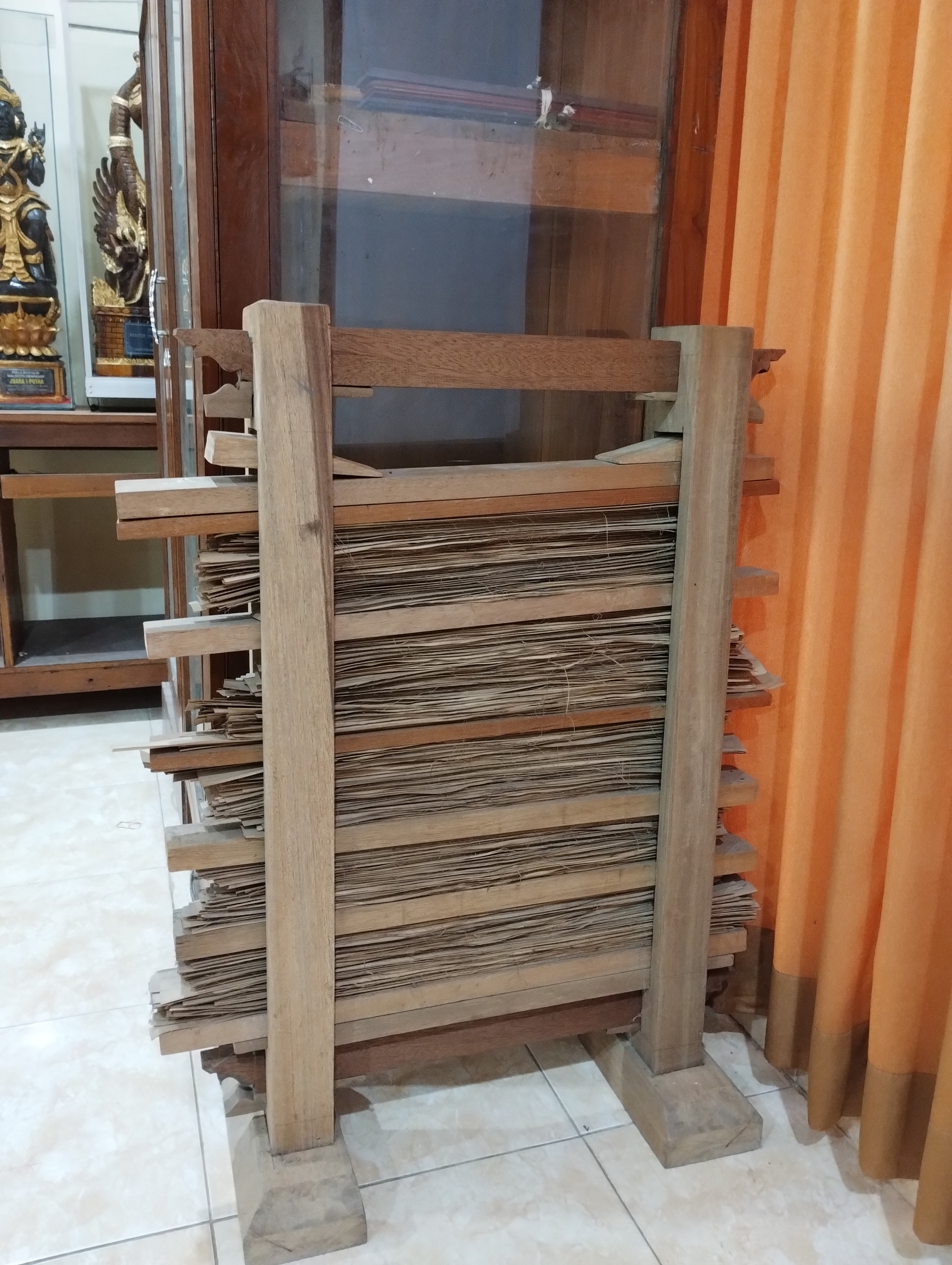
Press used for preparing palm leaves for writing.

The palm leaves are first cooked and dried. The writer then uses a stylus to inscribe letters. Natural colourings are applied to the surface so the ink will stick to the grooves. This process is similar to intaglio printing. Afterwards, a clean cloth is used to wipe out the excess ink and the leaf manuscript is done.

== See also ==
- Birch bark manuscript
- Folding-book manuscript
- Gandhāran Buddhist texts
- Ho trai, library of Thai Temple
- Pitakataik, scriptural libraries in Myanmar
- Orihon, a concertina-folded book format originating in China and popularized in Japan
- Palm Leaf Manuscript Museum, Thiruvananthapuram, world's first and largest Palm-leaf Manuscript Museum
- U Pho Thi Library
