= Junya Hosokawa =

Japanese footballer

Junya Hosokawa 細川 淳矢
Personal information
- Full name: Junya Hosokawa
- Date of birth: 24 June 1984 (age 42)
- Place of birth: Kōnosu, Saitama, Japan
- Height: 1.82 m (6 ft 0 in)
- Position: Defender

Youth career
- 2003–2006: Sendai University

Senior career*
Years	Team	Apps	(Gls)
2006–2011	Vegalta Sendai	9	(0)
2012–2021	Mito HollyHock	259	(6)
2022	FC Imabari	3	(0)
- * Club domestic league appearances and goals as of 12 January 2023

Junya Hosokawa (細川 淳矢, Hosokawa Jun'ya; born 24 June 1984) is a former Japanese footballer.

== Career statistics ==
Updated to end of 2018 season.

Appearances and goals by club, season and competition
Club	Season	League			Emperor's Cup		J.League Cup		Total	
Club	Season	Division	Apps	Goals	Apps	Goals	Apps	Goals	Apps	Goals
Vegalta Sendai	2006	J2 League	2	0	0	0	-		2	0
Vegalta Sendai	2007	J2 League	1	0	1	0	-		2	0
Vegalta Sendai	2008	J2 League	3	0	0	0	-		3	0
Vegalta Sendai	2009	J2 League	0	0	0	0	-		0	0
Vegalta Sendai	2010	J1 League	0	0	0	0	2	0	2	0
Vegalta Sendai	2011	J1 League	3	0	1	0	1	0	5	0
Mito Hollyhock	2012	J2 League	7	1	1	0	-		8	1
Mito Hollyhock	2013	J2 League	39	1	2	1	-		41	2
Mito Hollyhock	2014	J2 League	10	0	1	0	-		11	0
Mito Hollyhock	2015	J2 League	32	1	2	0	-		34	1
Mito Hollyhock	2016	J2 League	35	2	0	0	-		35	2
Mito Hollyhock	2017	J2 League	37	2	0	0	-		37	2
Mito Hollyhock	2018	J2 League	40	0	0	0	-		40	0
Career total			209	7	8	1	3	0	220	8
