= Wat Yai Suwannaram =

Buddhist temple in Phetchaburi, Thailand

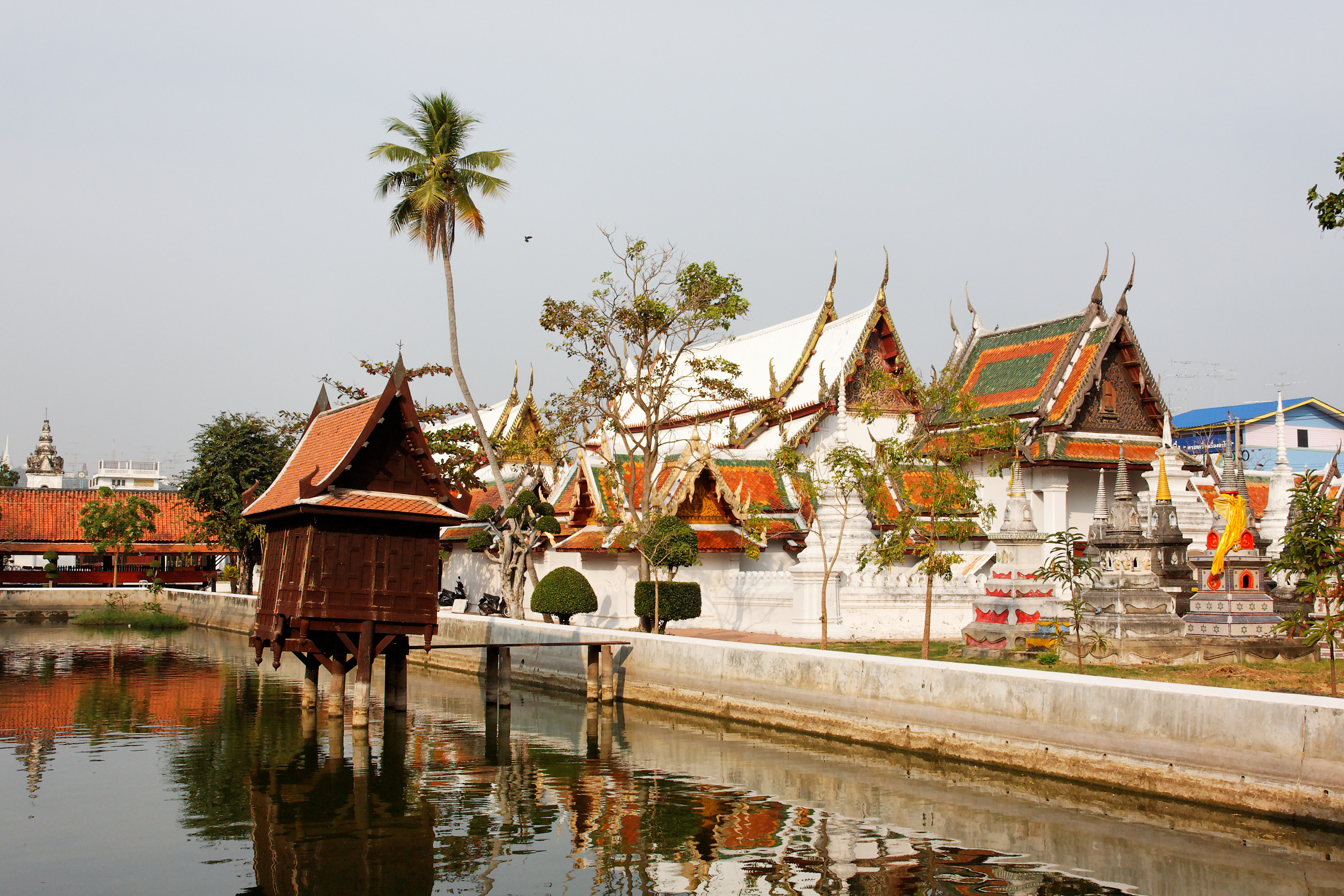
The ho trai on the water and ubosot in the background

Wat Yai Suwannaram Worawihan (Thai: วัดใหญ่สุวรรณาราม) is a Thai Theravada Buddhist temple (wat) in Phetchaburi. It is a royal temple of the third class, and dates at least from the Ayutthaya period.

Today, the temple is particularly known for its historic architecture, including the old murals in the ordination hall (ubosot), the scripture library (ho trai) elevated on three stilts above a pool, and the teak sermon hall (sala kan parian). The last is recorded as having been donated by Phrachao Suea, the King of Ayutthaya, to the supreme patriarch Somdet Chao Taengmo, who had studied at the temple and significantly expanded it in the early 18th century.
