= Pitakataik =

Buddhist scriptural libraries in pre-colonial Myanmar

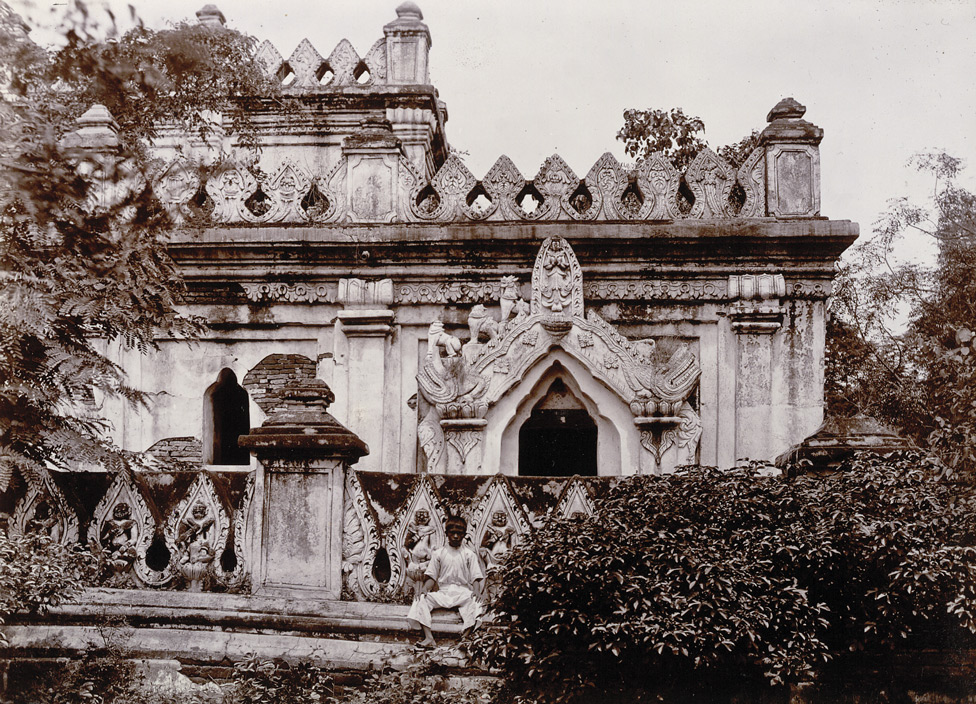
Parapet of the Pitakataik in Mandalay in 1904

Pitakataik (Burmese: ပိဋကတ်တိုက်; also spelt bidagat taik and pitaka taik) is a library of Buddhist scriptures, including the Tipiṭaka, found in Buddhist societies in modern-day Myanmar (Burma).

== History ==
The pitakataik dates to the pre-colonial era. During the Pagan Kingdom era, Anawrahta commissioned a square-shaped pitakataik that measured 51 square feet (4.7 m^{2}), built in the style of a temple with a central plinth surrounded by a corridor, located 150 feet (46 m) from the Tharabha Gate. Subsequent monarchs, including Kyansittha, Htilominlo, and Kyaswa, continued the tradition of building pitakataiks during their reigns, ushering in a tradition of royals and laypersons alike commissioning pitakataiks. By the First Toungoo Empire era, the pitakataik was considered a requisite edifice for a royal capital, and it was built in Bayinnaung's capital of Hanthawaddy (now Bago, Myanmar).

During the Mrauk U period, 48 pitakataik were established within the compounds of pagodas and monasteries. They remain one of the few buildings that survive from that period. Of these, the Khain-Kaik Pitakataik, built by Min Phalaung in 1591 and located north of Htuparon Pagoda, is the best preserved.

By the Konbaung dynasty, the pitakataik was one of the seven integral structures (နန်းတည် သတ္တဌာန) whose foundations had to be laid in establishing a royal capital, demonstrating its importance. A royal pitakataik was built in each of the Konbaung kingdom's royal capitals, including Amarapura, Inwa, and Mandalay. According to a contemporaneous British account in 1795, the Pitakataik at Amarapura was described as the largest library between the Danube and China.

During the establishment of Mandalay as a royal capital, King Mindon Min commissioned the construction of a pitakataik at the foot of Mandalay Hill. Copies of Tipiṭaka texts were relocated from the Amarapura Pitakataik and deposited at the newly constructed library in January 1864. In October 2013, the Sitagu Sayadaw announced a donation to rebuild the Mandalay Pitakataik, along with the Thudhamma Zayat and Maha Pahtan Ordination Hall, with the consultation of Tampawaddy U Win Maung.

In the mid-1950s, Burmese Prime Minister U Nu commissioned the construction of the Pitakataik in Yangon to house Buddhist scriptures and writings associated with the Sixth Buddhist council.

== See also ==
- Pitakataik (Bagan)
- Pitakataik (Mandalay)
- Pitakataik (Yangon)
- U Pho Thi Library
- Ho trai (Library in Thai Temple)
- Tripiṭaka tablets at Kuthodaw Pagoda
