= U Pho Thi Library =

Buddhist library in Thaton, Myanmar

- ဦးဘိုးသီးပိဋကတ်တိုက်
- 16.923302374017855°N 97.37694950628828°E
- Location: Thaton, Myanmar
- Type: Pitakataik
- Established: 1923; 103 years ago

Collection
- Items collected: Parabaiks; palm-leaf manuscripts
- Size: 785 manuscripts

Other information
- Affiliation: Sadhammajotika Monastery

U Pho Thi Library (Burmese: ဦးဘိုးသီးပိဋကတ်တိုက်), officially known as the Sādhu-janapāsādika Mahādhammacetī (lit. 'great temple of the Dhamma which pleases good people'), is a Buddhist library or pitakataik in Thaton, Mon State, Myanmar. The library houses a rare collection of 785 traditional manuscripts, including palm leaf manuscripts and parabaiks, in a three-storey building donated by U Pho Thi, who is the library's namesake. Monastic examinations are held at the library, which part of Thaton's largest centre for Buddhist studies.

== History ==
The library was the brainchild of Burmese literature professor Kyaw Tun, and was funded and established by merchant U Pho Thi in 1923, along with the Suvaṇṇabhūmi Pariyatti Sāsanahita Trust.

In February 2013, the Pali Text Society, Sendai University, and the University of Toronto, along with local partners, began an ongoing initiative to digitise and catalogue Myanmar's palm-leaf manuscripts, including collections from this library, and Bagaya Monastery in Inwa. The digitised manuscripts are now available at the open-access Myanmar Manuscript Digital Library.

In 2019, the Pali Text Society published the Catalogue of Manuscripts in the U Pho Thi Library.

== Collection ==
The manuscripts date from the mid-16th century to the 1920s. Extremely rare manuscripts held by the library include Saddanītiṭīkā by Paññāsāmi, an advisor to King Mindon Min, Mukhamattasāra, Commentary on the Nāmacāradīpaka, by Chapaṭa Saddhammajotipāla from the Inwa era.
