= Thaton =

Thaton Burmese: သထုံ Mon: သဓီု
- Town
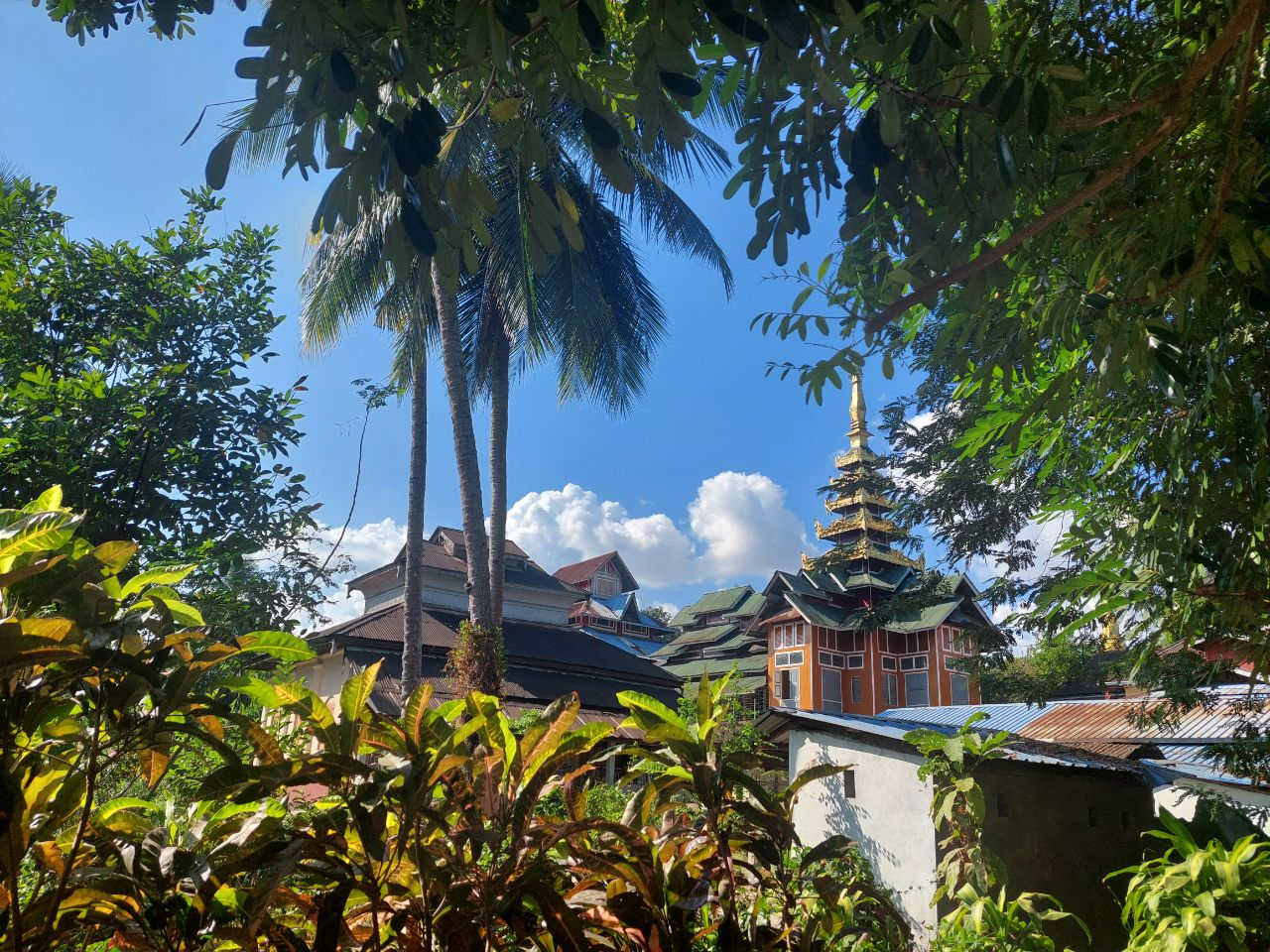

- Location in Myanmar
- Coordinates: 16°55′30″N 97°22′00″E
- Country: Myanmar
- Division: Mon State
- District: Thaton District

Population (2007)
  - Total: 130,763
  - Religions: Theravada Buddhism
- Time zone: UTC+6.30 (MST)
- Area code: 57

Thaton (Burmese: သထုံမြို့, MLCTS: sa. htum mrui.pronounced [θətʰòʊɰ̃ mjo̰]; Mon: သဓီု /səthɜ̤m/) is a town in Mon State, in southern Myanmar on the Tenasserim plains. Thaton lies along the National Highway 8 and is also connected by the National Road 85. It is 230 kilometres (140 mi) southeast of Yangon and 70 kilometres (43 mi) north of Mawlamyine. Thaton was the capital of Thaton Kingdom from at least the 4th century BC to the middle of the 11th century AD.

== Etymology ==
Thaton is the Burmese name of Sathuim (သဓီု) in Mon, which in turn is from Sudhammapura (သုဓမ္မပူရ) in Pali, after Sudharma, the moot hall of the gods. This name has Buddhist symbolism: according to the 4th-century Buddhavaṃsa, this was the name of the city where the Śobhita Buddha was born, as well as the name of his father, and "Sudhammavati" was also the name of the city where the Sujāta Buddha "held his first assembly of monks". The name of Thaton probably originated as the formal Pali name "Sudhamma", which then became vernacular Mon form "Sadhuim", which is in turn pronounced "Thaton" in Burmese.

== Geography ==
Thaton is located on a "fanlike" area at the foot of an elongated mountain spur, with the coast to the west. There is a significant slope within the city, from 43 m above sea level at the northeast corner to 9 m in the southwest. Just south of Thaton, the mountain range opens up and there is a valley 20 km long offering passage to Hpa-an and eventually over the Three Pagodas Pass to central Thailand. Besides the mountain range, there are also eight smaller hills that form a low arc around the city. Seven of these are located on the west and south, which conveniently provide protection against flooding on the side that is otherwise exposed to the sea. The eighth hill, Neimindara, is on the northeast. It is thought to have been a key strategic point in pre-cannon times, and "the troops that held this hill controlled the city".

On the west side of Thaton is a fault line, which the railway follows. To the south are the Gawt and Waba streams.

Southern Myanmar has extensive deposits of laterite, a reddish-yellow soil which is rich in iron. At Thaton, this is found as a "clay layer" about 10 cm below the ground surface. Historically, laterite was widely used as a building material in southern Myanmar, and today, it is also mined extensively for iron in the area north of Thaton.

Silting has resulted in the coastline moving 16 kilometres (9.9 mi) away from Thaton, which is now a sleepy town on the rail line from Bago to Mawlamyine (Moulmein).

=== Climate ===
Climate data for Thaton (1991–2020)
Month	Jan	Feb	Mar	Apr	May	Jun	Jul	Aug	Sep	Oct	Nov	Dec	Year
Mean daily maximum °C (°F)	32.8 (91.0)	34.5 (94.1)	35.7 (96.3)	36.2 (97.2)	33.1 (91.6)	30.1 (86.2)	29.2 (84.6)	29.0 (84.2)	30.5 (86.9)	32.8 (91.0)	33.3 (91.9)	32.4 (90.3)	32.5 (90.5)
Daily mean °C (°F)	25.2 (77.4)	26.8 (80.2)	29.1 (84.4)	30.5 (86.9)	28.8 (83.8)	27.0 (80.6)	26.4 (79.5)	26.2 (79.2)	27.1 (80.8)	28.3 (82.9)	27.6 (81.7)	25.6 (78.1)	27.4 (81.3)
Mean daily minimum °C (°F)	17.6 (63.7)	19.1 (66.4)	22.5 (72.5)	24.7 (76.5)	24.5 (76.1)	23.9 (75.0)	23.6 (74.5)	23.5 (74.3)	23.8 (74.8)	23.8 (74.8)	21.8 (71.2)	18.8 (65.8)	22.3 (72.1)
Average precipitation mm (inches)	6.9 (0.27)	4.0 (0.16)	20.4 (0.80)	73.7 (2.90)	573.5 (22.58)	1,009.8 (39.76)	1,286.5 (50.65)	1,263.3 (49.74)	744.1 (29.30)	232.1 (9.14)	47.9 (1.89)	13.6 (0.54)	5,276 (207.7)
Average precipitation days (≥ 1.0 mm)	0.6	0.4	1.9	4.1	19.9	27.7	28.8	29.4	25.4	13.7	3.0	0.7	155.6
Source: World Meteorological Organization

== History ==
Thaton was the capital of the Thaton Kingdom, a Mon Kingdom which ruled present day Lower Burma between the 4th and 11th centuries. Like the Burmans and the Thais, some modern Mons have tried to identify their ethnicity and, specifically this kingdom at Thaton, with the semi-historical kingdom of Suwarnabhumi ("The Golden Land"); today, this claim is contested by many different ethnicities in south-east Asia, and contradicted by scholars.

In the kingdom of Dvaravati, Thaton was an important seaport on the Gulf of Martaban, for trade with India and Sri Lanka. Shin Arahan, also called Dhammadassi, a monk born in Thaton and raised and educated in Nakhon Pathom, an old capital of the Mon kingdom of Dvaravadi, now in Thailand, took Theravada Buddhism north to the Burmese kingdom of Bagan. In 1057, King Anawrahta of Bagan conquered Thaton.

However, Michael Aung-Thwin, has disputed the entire traditional narrative of a "Thaton Kingdom" and its conquest by Anawrahta. No contemporary inscriptions refer to Thaton or its conquest by Anawrahta, and the full version of the conquest story does not appear in later chronicles until U Kala's Mahayazawingyi, written in the early 1700s. Aung-Thwin also disputes the existence of Thaton itself during this time period, writing that "it is not even certain that the area... was not under the ocean" during the first millennium CE, since the shoreline likely would have been much farther inland at the time.

=== Contemporary epigraphy ===
The first undisputed mention of Thaton is in the 1479 Kalyani Inscriptions, which were written in the Middle Mon language and attributed to Dhammazedi. This inscription uses "Sudhuim", which is the usual Mon form of the name.

Thaton is not mentioned before this, although other inscriptions from Bagan and Ava monarchs do mention places farther south. Then in 1486, the name Sudhammapura appears in three Mon inscriptions. There is one inscription purportedly dating to 1067 records the building of a temple by a king Manuho of Thaton, but based on linguistic analysis (for example, the spelling of certain words is more characteristic of later times than of Pagan times), Aung-Thwin says the inscription is likely from a later period. (Even among scholars who are proponents of the idea that Thaton was a major capital at this time period, the 1067 inscription is also rejected for the same reasons, and they say it could be no earlier than the 1500s.)

The earliest dated inscriptions found near Thaton (but not mentioning it) are the Kyaik Talan and Kyaik Te inscriptions, which were made in 1098 under Kyanzittha. The two inscriptions were found at the Kyaik Talan and Kyaik Te stupas in Ayetthema, on the northwest side of Kelasa Mountain. The inscriptions record the renovation of the stupas under Kyanzittha.

=== Archaeology ===
An urban site at Thaton was excavated between 1975 and 1977 under U Myint Aung. The site is small, with an area of about 1,500 square yards and "at most three major stupas". A large structure that may have been a palace has partially been excavated, at the center of the site. Part of the city walls also remain.

The walled area of Thaton is mostly rectangular in shape, roughly measuring 2010 m from north to south and 1290 m from east to west. The walls aren't perfectly rectangular, though — the northeast and southeast corners each have a few rounded segments that serve to "draw water off from streams flowing down from peaks on the escarpment". The overall layout resembles the 1st-millennium site of Halin, which also had a rectangular shape. (Note: Michael Aung-Thwin, doubtful of an early date for Thaton, wrote that Thaton's rectangular plan "[does] not resemble the cities of the preclassical period in Southeast Asia to which it was said to belong", i.e. the circular or rounded Pyu sites like Śrī Kṣetra or Beikthano. Instead, he wrote, Thaton had more of a resemblance to later Burmese capitals like Amarapura and Mandalay. However, Donald Stadtner criticized Aung-Thwin's argument for overlooking the similarity between Thaton and Halin. Stadtner instead cited the fingermarked bricks as supporting a 1st-millennium date for Thaton.)

The lower layers of Thaton's city walls contain numerous fingermarked bricks, which according to Elizabeth Moore are characteristic of first-millennium architectural remains over a wide area including not just Myanmar but also parts of India and Thailand. (Note: Aung-Thwin described the fingermarked bricks at Thaton as "distinctly Pyu", but Stadtner dismissed this as evidence of Pyu influence at Thaton because the bricks are found over such a broad area.) As a result, Moore and San Win date the walls of Thaton to the first millennium as well.

Remains of city gates have been found on the north and south walls, but none have been found on the east or west walls.

Three carved reliefs of Hindu deities found at Thaton in the 19th century have been variously stylistically dated to the 9th/10th or 11th centuries. One depicts Shiva and Parvati. The other two are reddish sandstone reliefs, each over a meter tall, depicting the god Vishnu reclining on the serpent Ananta Shesha. Three lotus stems are depicted as coming out of Vishnu's navel, and smaller figures of Vishnu, Brahma, and Shiva are depicted sitting on them. (Normally, there would only be one lotus and deity coming out of Vishnu's navel.) The exact find spots for these three reliefs was not recorded, so their function is unknown. They were likely intended for local faithful, indicating an "eclectic religious milieu" at first-millennium Thaton. All three were destroyed during the Second World War when they were kept in the University of Yangon's library.

Another relief (Note: This might just be a more detailed description of the relief with Shiva and Parvati as mentioned above; the sources aren't clear) found at Thaton is a 1.2 m-tall depiction of Shiva sitting down, with his bull Nandi shown below his right leg and a "buffalo demon" below his left knee.

There is also a set of sema, or boundary stones, at the Kalyani Thein ordination hall near the Shweyazan stupa. The Kalyani sema are each over a meter tall and carved with panels depicting the life of Gautama Buddha and floral designs at the top. Their date is highly uncertain — stylistically similar sema found in Thailand are associated with the Dvaravati culture and dated to the 6th through 9th centuries, but the Kalyani sema also have their own distinct forms that have been tentatively associated with Mon migrations from Haripuñjaya in the 12th and 13th centuries.

Myint Aung's excavation in the 1970s did not produce any radiocarbon dating, so the exact date of the site is uncertain. According to Moore and San Win, repeated renovations and additions to pilgrimage sites has made detecting first-millennium remains "extremely difficult". However, as mentioned above, they identify the fingermarked bricks as evidence of first-millennium occupation at Thaton.

=== Historiography of the conquest story ===
The origins of the conquest story by Anawrahta in 1057 are unclear and "apparently does not go back to any single source". According to Michael Aung-Thwin, the story may have originated from Bagan's conquest of Lower Burma during this period. Anawrahta's southward expansion is well-documented in contemporary inscriptions, with about 28 votive tablets recording his activity as far south as Mergui. But no Bagan-era inscription mentions a conquest of Thaton, which would be unusual because it would have been directly on the route to Mergui.

==== In the Zambu Kungya ====
The earliest text to mention something like the conquest of Thaton is the Zambu Kungya, written by Wun Zin Min Yaza, who served as a minister under the Ava-period kings Mingyi Swasawke and Mingaung I in the late 1300s and early 1400s. The only surviving part of this is an 1825 copy, although some of its content was also incorporated into the Maniyadanabon, which was written in the late 1700s. This version (the one incorporated into the Maniyadanabon) says nothing about a conquest of Thaton; it only says that in 1054 "the king, ministers, officers, people, and monks of Thaton carried the three Pitakas of the scriptures" to Bagan. Although the version in the Maniyadanabon was only written in 1781, Aung-Thwin writes that it "is very likely a good preservation" of the Zambu.

==== In the Kalyani Inscriptions ====
The Kalyani Inscriptions of 1479, which are relatively close in date to the Zambu Kungya, are often cited to illustrate the conquest of Thaton, However, Aung-Thwin writes that the Kalyani Inscriptions contain no direct reference to this event. Instead, they refer to two completely separate things: in one part, the Pali version of the inscription says simply that Anawrahta "took a community of monks together with the Tipiṭaka and established the religion in Arimaddanapura, otherwise called Pugāma", without saying where the monks or texts came from; in another part, the inscriptions refer to the decline of Thaton during the reign of a king Manohor, without mentioning any sort of conquest. These two parts were then conflated, according to Aung-Thwin, into a single narrative of conquest in 18th-century chronicles and then repeated by 19th-century colonial scholars.

Aung-Thwin interprets the Kalyani Inscriptions as a way of legitimizing Dhammazedi's religious reform to more closely follow what he saw as a more "orthodox" form of Theravada Buddhism of the Mahavihara tradition. Thus, the story of Thaton's decline under Manohor was meant to "illustrate what happened when Buddhist kings allowed the religion to decay". It also "invented the tradition of an 'earlier' Thaton" that had practiced an earlier, more "pure" version of Buddhism before being corrupted, so that his own religious reforms could appeal to an even older tradition and overcome opposition from "conservative forces in Lower Burma" who were following an allegedly corrupted strain of Buddhism.

==== In the Jinakālamālī ====
The Jinakālamālī, written in Pali in the early 1500s by an author from Chiang Mai, is the first work to mention Anawrahta's conquest of Manohara's kingdom. It appears to treat the story as "an illustration of Buddhist principles": a weak ruler like Manohara, who fails to properly uphold Buddhist ideals, would inevitably be defeated by a strong ruler who does.

==== In the Mahayazawingyi ====
The "first chronicle of Burma with the most comprehensive and complete version" of the conquest story is U Kala's Mahayazawingyi, written sometime between 1712 and 1720. It is not clear where U Kala got this story from — none of the sources he is said to have used mention the conquest of Thaton. He may have been using older sources that are now lost, or he may have synthesized or embellished it based on the sources he was using. In any case, U Kala's version proved influential: it was used as a source for both the Yazawin Thit and especially the Hmannan Maha Yazawindawgyi, which "depended heavily on his work".

==== In the Yazawin Thit ====
The Yazawin Thit, written by Twinthin Taikwun Maha Sithu in the late 1700s, introduces a couple of details not found in previous or contemporary sources. First, Twinthin — a well-educated scholar who was already familiar with Old Burmese inscriptions — was the first scholar to specifically cite the Kalyani Inscriptions as a source for the conquest of Thaton (probably because he interpreted it as confirming what was by his time "common knowledge"). Second, he was the first one to write that Shin Arahan was born at Thaton, which was repeated in the Hmannan.

== Sites of interest ==
Thaton's primary Buddhist pagoda is Shwesayan Pagoda, which is near the town's main Myoma Market. Myathabeik Pagoda is perched on a hilltop east of the town. Thaton is home to the U Pho Thi Library, which houses an extensive collection of palm-leaf manuscripts, at the Saddhammajotikārāma Monastery.

== Health care ==
- Thaton District Hospital

== Education ==
Thaton is home to Computer University (Thaton), which offers five-year bachelor's degree programs in computer science and computer technology. It is also the home of Thaton Institute of Agriculture.
