= Bagaya Monastery =

Buddhist monastery in Inwa, Myanmar

- ဗားကရာဘုန်းကြီးကျောင်း
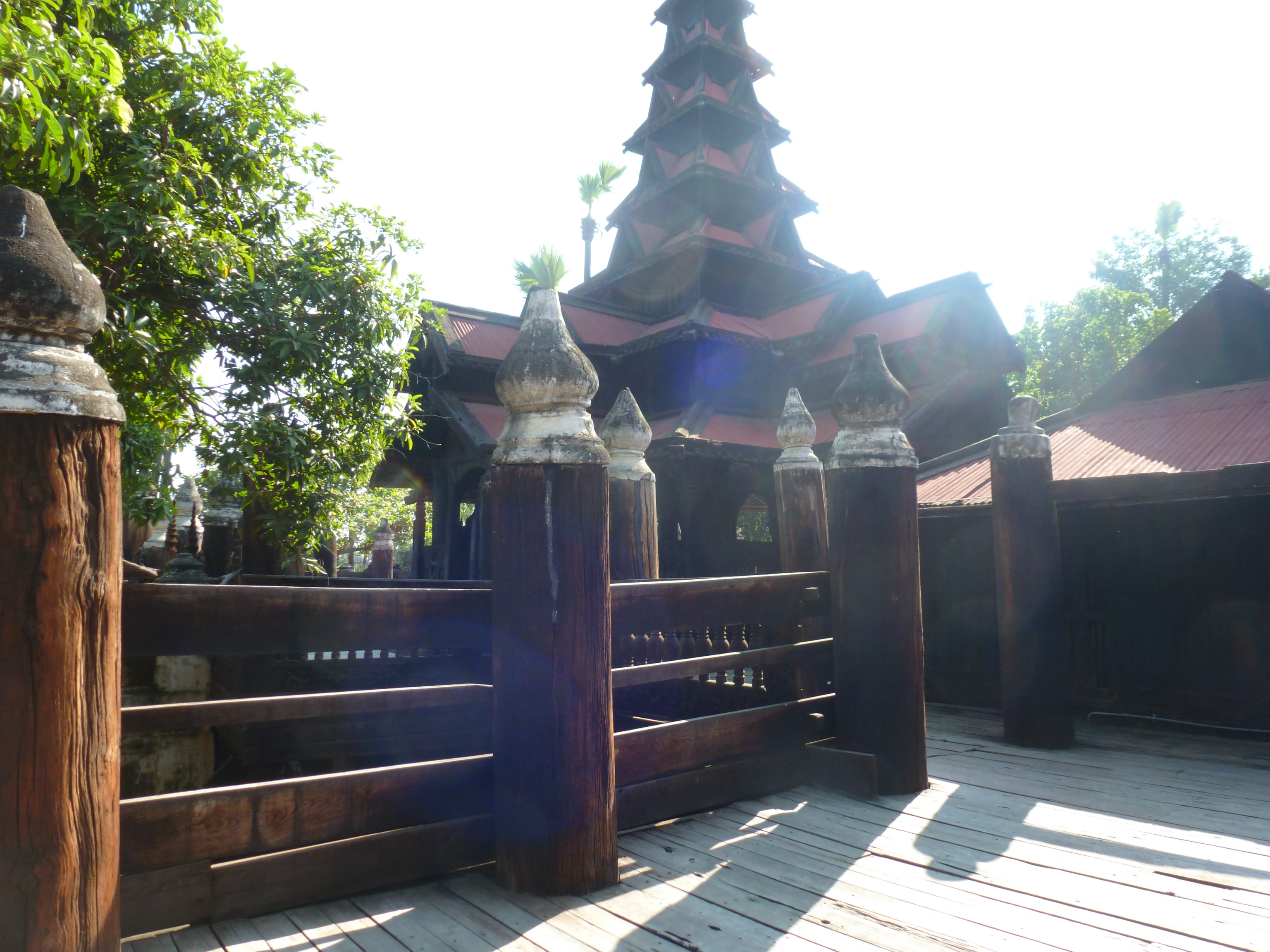
- Front of the Bagaya Monastery

- Location within Myanmar

Religion
- Affiliation: Theravada Buddhism

Location
- Location: Inwa
- Country: Myanmar
- Coordinates: 21.8484°N 95.9682°E

Architecture
- Founder: Maha Thiri Zeya Thinkhaya
- Completed: 1593; 433 years ago

The Bagaya Monastery (Burmese: ဘားဂရာ ကျောင်း), located in Inwa, Mandalay Region, Burma (Myanmar) is a Buddhist monastery built on the southwest of Inwa Palace. This magnificent monastery is also known as Maha Waiyan Bontha Bagaya Monastery. During King Hsinbyushin's reign (1763–1776), Maha Thiri Zeya Thinkhaya, town officer of Magwe built the monastery in the Bagaya monastic establishment and dedicated to Shin Dhammabhinanda. It is one of the famous tourist attractions in Burma.

== Etymology ==
Bagaya (ဘားဂရာ) is a Burmese transliteration of the Mon name phea kao kih (Mon: ဘာ ပ္ကဴ ကေဟ်; lit. 'starflower monastery').

== History ==
This teak wood monastery was first built in 1593 about 11 miles (18 km) from present-day Mandalay. During King Bagyidaw (1819–1837), a great fire broke out on 15 April 1821. Many important buildings, including the Bagaya Monastery, were burnt in the fire. The government tried to reconstruct in 1992 and built the new brick building in the place of the old monastery for the use of Buddha image and Pitaka scriptures. It was recorded that the monastery was constructed based on the model of the old monastery.

In 2016, the abbot of Bagaya Monastery requested that the monastery's large collection of palm-leaf manuscripts be transferred to the National Library of Myanmar for preservation and conservation. The National Library digitised the manuscripts in 2018, in partnership with the Pali Text Society.

== Architecture ==
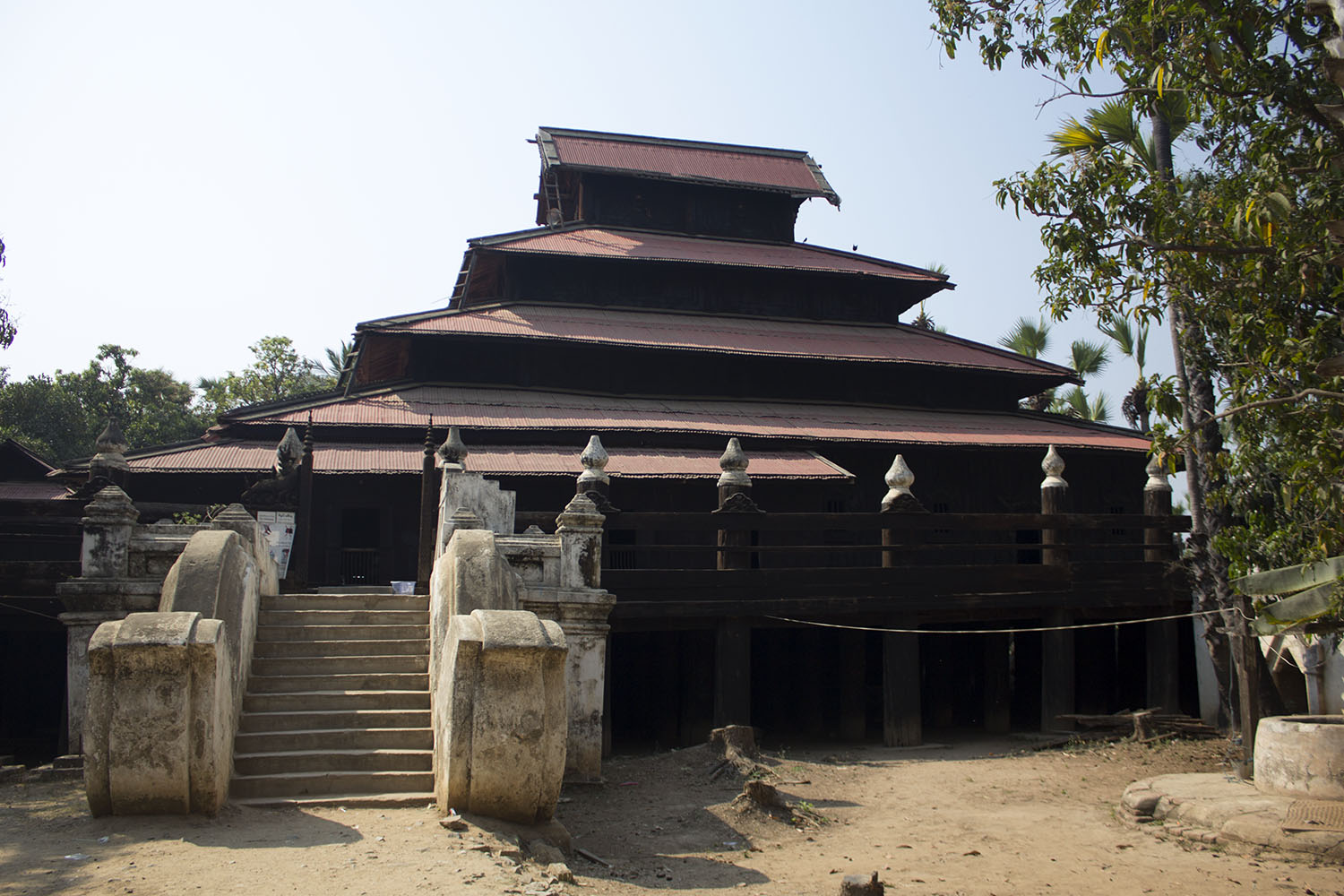
Bagaya Monastery

The Bagaya Monastery which consists of the seven-tiered spire has Dhanu hall and Bhawga hall. It also has eight stairways made up of bricks. The monastery, which was built with 267 gigantic teak wood posts, has a structure of great dimensions: 188 feet (57 m) high in length and 103 feet (31 m) in width. The monastery stands in the middle of wide paddy fields, with palms, banana trees and thorny green bushes clustered in profusion around its shady base. The monastery is decorated with Burmese architectural works such as carvings, floral arabesques, the ornamentation with curved figurines and the reliefs of birds and animals as well as small pillars decorated on the wall, the artistic works of Inwa Era.
