= Panchshil Realty =

Indian real estate company

Panchshil Realty is an Indian real estate development company with its headquarters in Pune, Maharashtra. It was founded by Atul Chordia in 2002. The company develops residential, commercial, and retail properties in India and Dubai. Its commercial developments include EON Free Zone and World Trade Center Pune in Kharadi.

Its hospitality subsidiary, Ventive Hospitality, operates hotels in India, Sri Lanka, and the Maldives. Ventive Hospitality was listed on the Bombay Stock Exchange and the National Stock Exchange of India in December 2024.

== History ==
Panchshil Realty was established by Atul Chordia in 2002. Its early developments in Pune included Satellite Towers, AXA Business and International Convention Centre (ICC). It completed Tech Park One for IBM in 2003 and received investment from Merrill Lynch in 2004.

EON Free Zone I opened in Kharadi in 2006 as an IT and IT-enabled services SEZ. The development covers acres and has about 4.5 million square feet of built-up space in five clusters. The company later opened Oakwood Residence.

In 2010, Panchshil launched yoopune, a residential project designed with Philippe Starck and John Hitchcox of the YOO group. That same year, Panchshil partnered with Marriott International to open Courtyard by Marriott, representing the brand's entry into Pune. In 2013, the Pune Marriott Hotel and Convention Centre was rebranded as the JW Marriott Hotel Pune.

In 2014, Panchshil and Blackstone jointly acquired Express Towers in Nariman Point, Mumbai. The company entered into an agreement with the Government of Maharashtra in 2015 for the development of three projects in Mumbai and Pune.

Panchshil launched YOO Villas in Kharadi in 2018, with interiors by Kelly Hoppen. It began developing small office home office (SOHO) projects in eastern Pune in 2020, and in 2021 it partnered with the Singaporean sovereign wealth fund GIC to develop the EON West commercial project.

== Operations ==
Panchshil develops commercial office properties in Pune, including EON Free Zone in Kharadi, Tech Park One, Panchshil Business Park (East and West), and Panchshil Business Hub. The company also developed World Trade Center Pune in 2013, a 2.1 million square feet commercial complex in Kharadi and part of the World Trade Centers Association network.

The company's residential developments include Panchshil Towers, a 100-metre high-rise complex in Kharadi, as well as yoopune, Trump Towers Pune, YOO Villas, and Avant Garde in Friends Colony, New Delhi. Trump Towers Pune was developed in partnership with The Trump Organization. Panchshil is involved in the hospitality sector through Ventive Hospitality Limited, a joint venture with Blackstone. Ventive owns commercial and hospitality developments in India, Sri Lanka, and the Maldives. Ventive was listed on the Bombay Stock Exchange and the National Stock Exchange of India in December 2024 after an initial public offering of about ₹1,600 crore (US$170 million).
