= Air India Building =

23-storey commercial tower in Mumbai, India

Coordinates: 18°55′49.74″N 72°49′19.21″E

The Air India Building
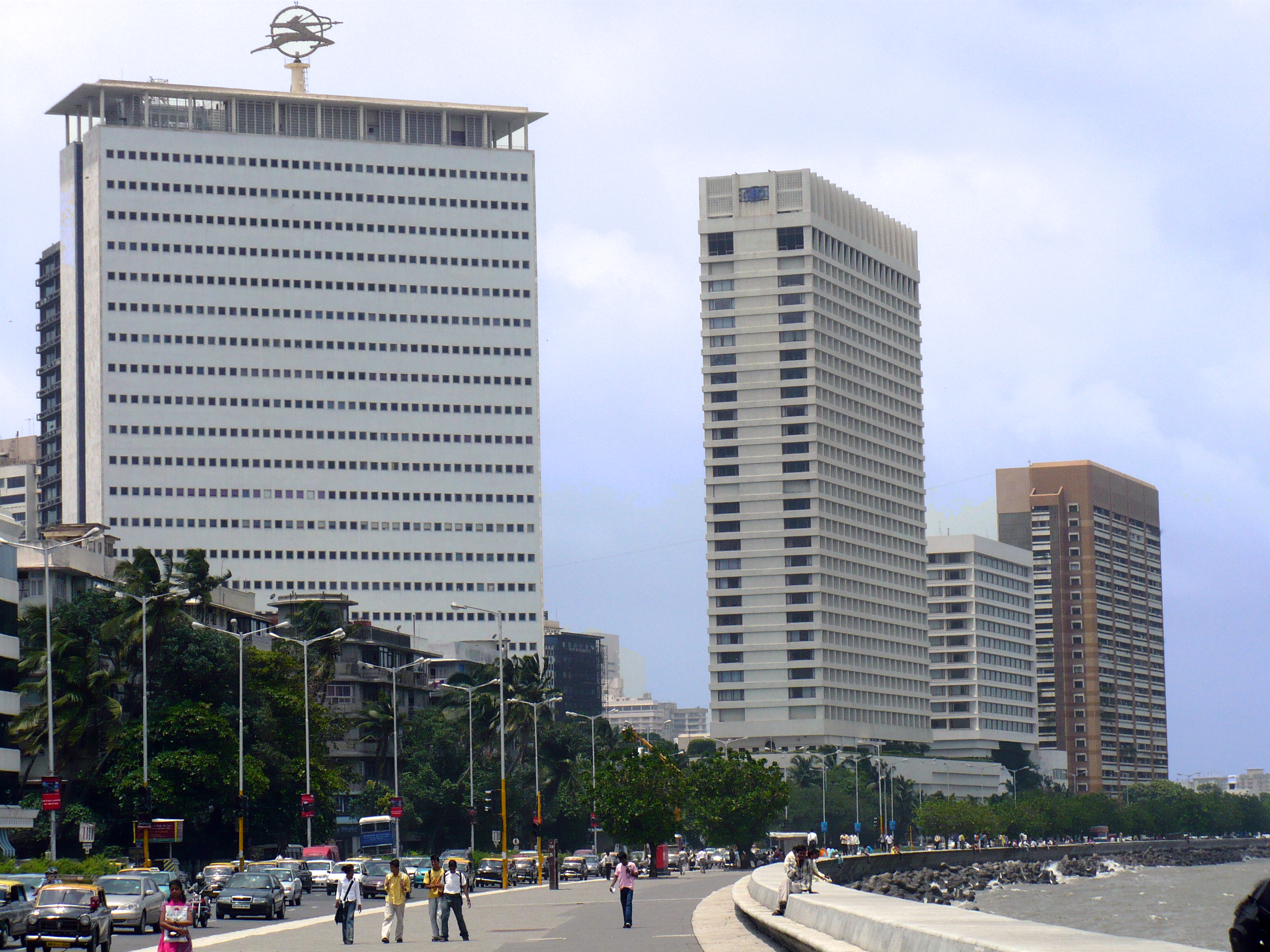
- Air India building on Marine Drive
- Interactive map of the The Air India Building area

General information
- Location: Nariman Point, Mumbai, India
- Current tenants: Government of Maharashtra
- Completed: 1974
- Owner: Government of Maharashtra

Height
- Height: 105 metres (344 ft)

Technical details
- Floor count: 23
- Floor area: 220,000 square feet (20,000 m^{2})

Design and construction
- Architect: John Burgee

The Air India Building is a 23-storey commercial tower in Mumbai, India. The building served as the corporate headquarters for the Indian airline, Air India, up to 2013. There are at least 10,800 square feet (1,000 m^{2}) of space on each floor of the building. In February 2013, Air India officially vacated the building as part of its asset-monetisation plan, and shifted its corporate office to New Delhi.

The Indian Airlines House was chosen as the airline's new headquarters. However, the airline still retains the 21st, 22nd and 23rd floors in the building.

== History ==
John Burgee of the New York City architectural firm Johnson/Burgee designed the building. The Air India Building was completed in 1974, and is owned by the airline. It occupies one of Mumbai's choicest real estate locations in Nariman Point. Located on Marine Drive, facing the Arabian Sea, the building is a landmark on Mumbai's skyline with the airline's trademark centaur icon on its top. The centrally air-conditioned building was the first in India to have an escalator, carrying customers from the street-level to the airline's main booking office. It initially had 30 companies as tenants, now it has only 2. The Air India building was one of several high rises including Express Towers and the Oberoi Sheraton that came up at Nariman Point, a 64-acre reclamation from the sea which was initiated as a project to ease the housing crisis in Mumbai but was later auctioned off in plots to various companies. Air India once hung a board on this building, its new headquarters, that said "Nariman had a point and we're on it!".

The building was one of the targets of the 1993 Bombay bombings. A car bomb exploded in the afternoon on 12 March 1993 in the basement garage of the building. 20 people were killed in the attack and the offices of the Bank of Oman located above the garage were destroyed. In 2007, Farooq Pawale was convicted and sentenced to death for planting the bomb that led to 20 deaths and injured nearly 100 others.

=== 2010s ===
During June 2011, the ground floor was occupied by Tata Consultancy Services, and Air India occupied 7 floors and 15 floors lay empty. Air India started planning to move the Headquarters of Air India to Delhi, where the rent is cheaper. The Air India Building was then expected to be sold for Rs 20 billion or leased for ₹ 660 million every year. By January 2013, Air India continued to occupy six floors of the building. The office of the chairperson remained in the Air India Building. Moreover, it has offices of Service Tax & Income Tax under Ministry of Finance.

=== Air India head office move ===
In February 2013, Air India approved shifting its headquarters from Mumbai to Delhi and began leasing out vacant space in the building, while retaining the chairman's office on site. It leased four floors to the State Bank of India and aimed to raise ₹10 billion (US$120 million) through property monetisation by March 2014. Chairman Rohit Nandan stated that only three floors would remain with Air India, and later the Directorate General of Shipping leased an additional three floors.

By 2024, the building was sold to the Government of Maharashtra for ₹1,601 crore.
