= The New Indian Express =

Indian English-language daily newspaper

- The April 2011 redesigned front page of The New Indian Express
- Type: Daily newspaper
- Format: Broadsheet
- Owner: Express Publications (Madurai) Limited
- Publisher: Express Publications
- Editor-in-chief: Santwana Bhattacharya
- Founded: 1932 in Madras, British India, Bifurcated from The Indian Express and renamed in 13 August 1999
- Political alignment: Centre-left
- Language: English
- Headquarters: Chennai – 600 058
- OCLC number: 844203788
- Website: www.newindianexpress.com

The New Indian Express is an Indian English-language broadsheet daily newspaper published by the Chennai-based Express Publications. It was founded in 1932 as The Indian Express, under the ownership of Chennai-based P. Varadarajulu Naidu.

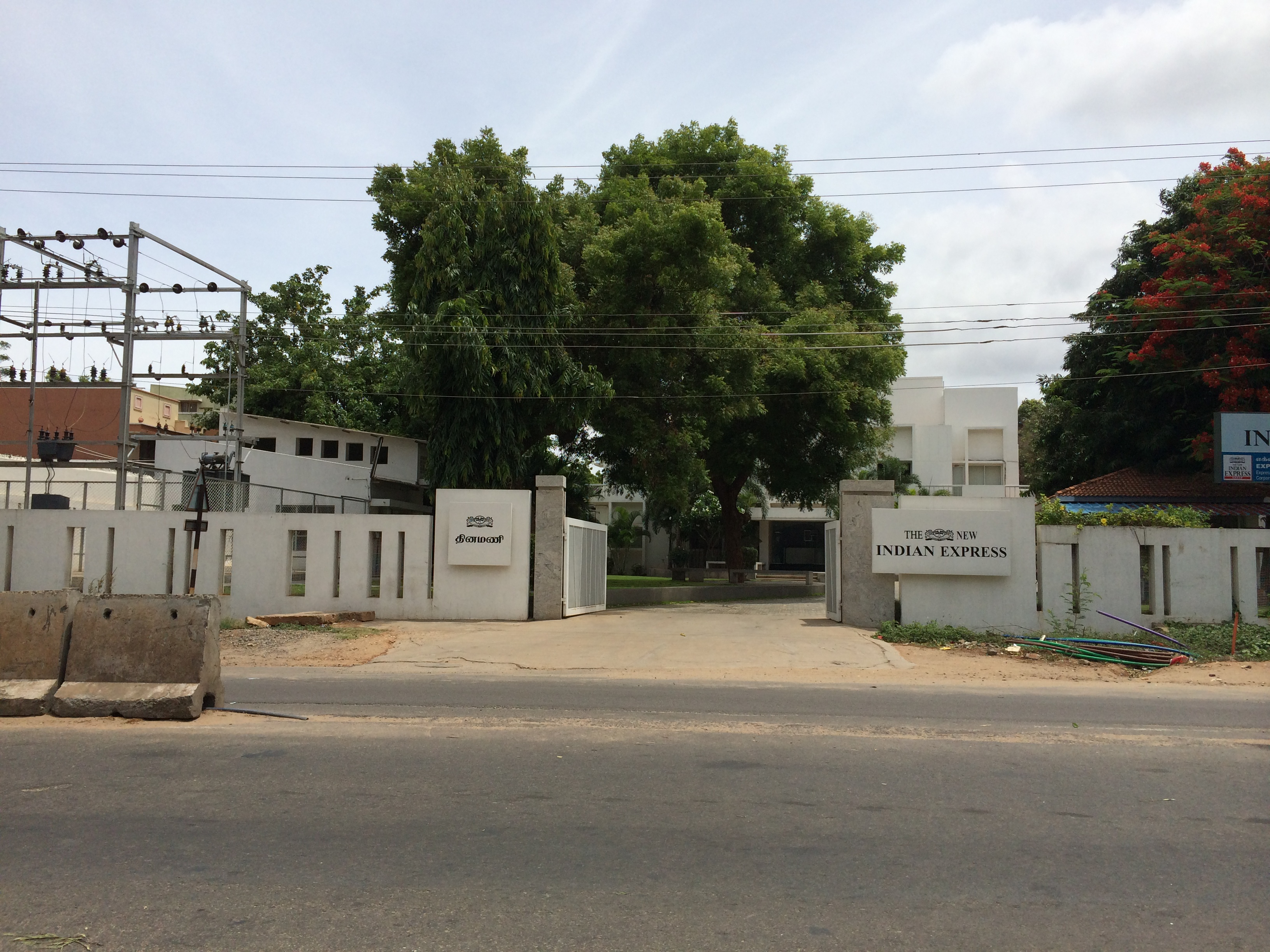
The New Indian Express and Dinamani, Coimbatore press

Santwana Bhattacharya was appointed Editor-in-Chief on 1 July 2022, replacing G.S. Vasu.

== History ==
Indian Express was first published on 5 September 1932, in Madras (now Chennai) by an Ayurvedic doctor and Indian National Congress member P Varadarajulu Naidu, publishing from the same press where he ran the Tamil Nadu Tamil weekly. But soon, on account of financial difficulties, he sold it to S. Sadanand, founder of The Free Press Journal, another English newspaper.

In later years, Goenka started the Mumbai edition with the landmark Express Towers as his office when the Morning Standard was bought by him in 1944. Two years later it became the Mumbai edition of The Indian Express. Later on, editions were started in cities like Madurai (1957), Bangalore (1965) and Ahmedabad (1968). The Financial Express was launched in 1961 from Mumbai, a Bangalore edition of Andhra Prabha was launched in 1965, and Gujarati dailies Lok Satta and Jansatta in 1952, from Ahmedabad and Baroda.

The Delhi edition started was when the Tej group's Indian News Chronicle was acquired in 1951, which from 1953 became the Delhi edition of Indian Express. In 1990 it bought the Sterling group of magazines and, along with it, the Gentleman magazine.

After Goenka's demise in 1991, two of the family members split the group into Indian Express Mumbai with all the north Indian editions, while the southern editions were grouped as Express Publications (Madurai) Limited with Chennai as headquarters.

== Editions ==
The New Indian Express is now published from all 22 major cities in Andhra Pradesh, Karnataka, Kerala, Odisha, Tamil Nadu Telangana and Morning Standard from Delhi.

== Circulation ==
Masthead from 1999 until 2008

The New Indian Express has a net paid circulation of 595,618 copies. It is published in a geographical area that covers approximately 24 per cent of the national population. The New Sunday Express (the Sunday edition of the NIE) is arguably the flagship publication, with magazine supplements incorporating national and international themes and sections on developmental issues, society, politics, literature, arts, cinema, travel, lifestyle, sports, new-age living, self-development and entertainment.

== Recent changes ==
City Express (Bengaluru) front page design as of September 2016

The New Sunday Express front page design as of April 2011

During late 2007/early 2008, there was a big shakeout of editorial staff, with many old hands leaving to make way for new. In April 2008, the newspaper underwent a major, drastic and exceptionally modern layout and design makeover and launched a huge advertising campaign.

=== Indulge ===
In October 2007, The New Indian Express launched a 40-page Friday magazine supplement (now, total colour) called Indulge exclusively for the Chennai edition. In September 2010, the lifestyle pullout began a Bangalore edition.

== Websites ==
The New Indian Express Group of Companies also publishes Dinamani in Tamil and the following magazines: Cinema Express (Tamil), Samakalika Malayalam Vaarika (Malayalam), in addition to the website Edex Live.

== See also ==
- Indian Express Group
- The Indian Express
- List of newspapers in India by circulation
- List of newspapers in the world by circulation
