= Joseph Allen Stein =

American architect

Joseph Allen Stein in 1986

Joseph Stein (10 April 1912 – 6 October 2001) was an American architect and a major figure in the establishment of a regional modern architecture in the San Francisco Bay area in the 1940s and 1950s during the early days of the environmental design movement. In 1952, he moved to India and in 1955 was tasked with the planning of Durgapur in West Bengal, India along with Benjamin Polk. He was commissioned with this task in order to facilitate the establishment of Durgapur Steel Plant later on in 1959 followed by the Durgapur Steel City and Township. He is noted for designing several important buildings in India, most notably in Lodi Estate in Central Delhi, nicknamed "Steinabad" after him, and where today the 'Joseph Stein Lane', is the only road in Delhi named after an architect. He is also famous for being the architect of the scenic Indian Institute of Management Kozhikode's campus. His work in both countries were inflected by socialist principles, modern aesthetics, and environmental consciousness. The most active years of his career are marked by the beginning of World War II and the rise of post-Independence India, a political period characterised by technological development world over and reflected in his modernist architecture. In 1992, the Government of India awarded him the fourth highest civilian award of Padma Shri. His works become relevant in a moment of environmental crisis where the need for sustainable and humane architecture is freshly felt.

== Early life ==
Joseph Allen Stein was born on 10 April 1912, in Omaha, Nebraska, to Jewish parents who had immigrated from East Europe. He studied architecture at the University of Illinois, the École nationale supérieure des Beaux-Arts in Paris and the Cranbrook Academy of Art. Before establishing his practice in San Francisco, he worked as an apprentice for Ely Jacques Kahn in New York during the Great Depression, and with Richard Neutra in Los Angeles. Los Angeles brought him in touch with Gregory Ain, a social activist and visionary architect, who would be significant influence in Stein's life. In San Francisco, he started working with Hervey P. Clark and later joined Bechtel which operated the Marinship yard during World War II. During his stint in California, Stein had presented prototypes for war housing at Architecture Forum (1942). However he is best known for designing modest homes in the California-style driven by his interest in the issues of low-cost housing. He was also an active member of the group known as Telesis, which sought to bring better design to the needs of the middle and working classes.

With the rise of McCarthyism in 1950, he felt the need to find a location where his talent as an architect could be more freely expressed. Moreover, Stein was being investigated for his political views. His son, David, revealed in an interview that Stein's name was on the attorney general's list of suspects for being critical of the Korean War. Stein had then been designing a 400-home housing cooperative at Ladera, for a mixed-race community in San Mateo County. However, racial hostility from civic society and federal policy discouraged Stein from staying. He left the US, first for Mexico and then for Europe, and finally arrived to teach at Bengal Engineering College (now Indian Institute of Engineering Science and Technology, Shibpur) outside Calcutta.

== Aesthetic Principles ==
The homes that Stein had designed in Northern California were drawn from the First Bay Tradition of architecture. Their mid-century modern designs saw the use of floor-to-ceiling glass windows, straight lights, and structures that would create the effect of light and space even in smaller homes. This was in keeping with the philosophy of the environmental design movement that prioritised environmental harmony and regional awareness. Although some of these designs, including Stein's own house in Laytonville, were experimental, his work in the Bay Area is best known for its affordability. According to Stein, a home for an average American family should cost only as much as an automobile. His choice of building materials, such as concrete over wood helped reduce costs. While wood was still the popular choice among Bay area architects, Stein recognised that it was a threatened resource in a post-war world. His concern for natural resources consistently showed up in his career, especially after moving to India where he worked close to the Himalayas. Stein took note of the reducing forest cover on the slopes of the Himalayas as he flew and forth to Kuala Lumpur for his professional commitments. He wrote to the American journalist Claire Sterling which prompted her to write an article in the Atlantic Monthly. Sterling's article caught the attention of John E Fobes, the deputy director of UNESCO, who with Klaus Lampe organized the first United Nations Conference on Mountain Environments in 1973. Therefore, Stein's commitment to the principles of environmental design movement indirectly played a role in shaping international policy.

Joseph Allen Stein entered India when a modern aesthetic of architecture was being forged post-independence. During the colonial rule, the disjunction between the Indian way of life and the architectural structures containing them became apparent. Architects like Stein were trying to stitch the present to the pre-colonial past through design, therefore defining what it means to be modern and Indian at the same time. Scholars who have read Stein's notes on neighbourhood planning observe that he was interested in recovering a pre-colonial aesthetic sensibility that existed in India. Stein was trying to tap into this aesthetic consciousness by attending to ways in which textiles were draped, ornaments were worn, and domestic rituals were performed. He believed that these stylistic choices could also be extended to designing urban space. For instance, throughout his work in the 50s and 60s, Stein incorporated "jaali" or lattice work in his buildings. Historically, the "jaali" in South Asian architecture, performed the role of a screen. The perforated screen with intricate design helped diffuse harsh sunlight as well as regulating temperature. Stein's designs were attentive to the natural conditions of the Indian climate and incorporated structures that played around with air and light.

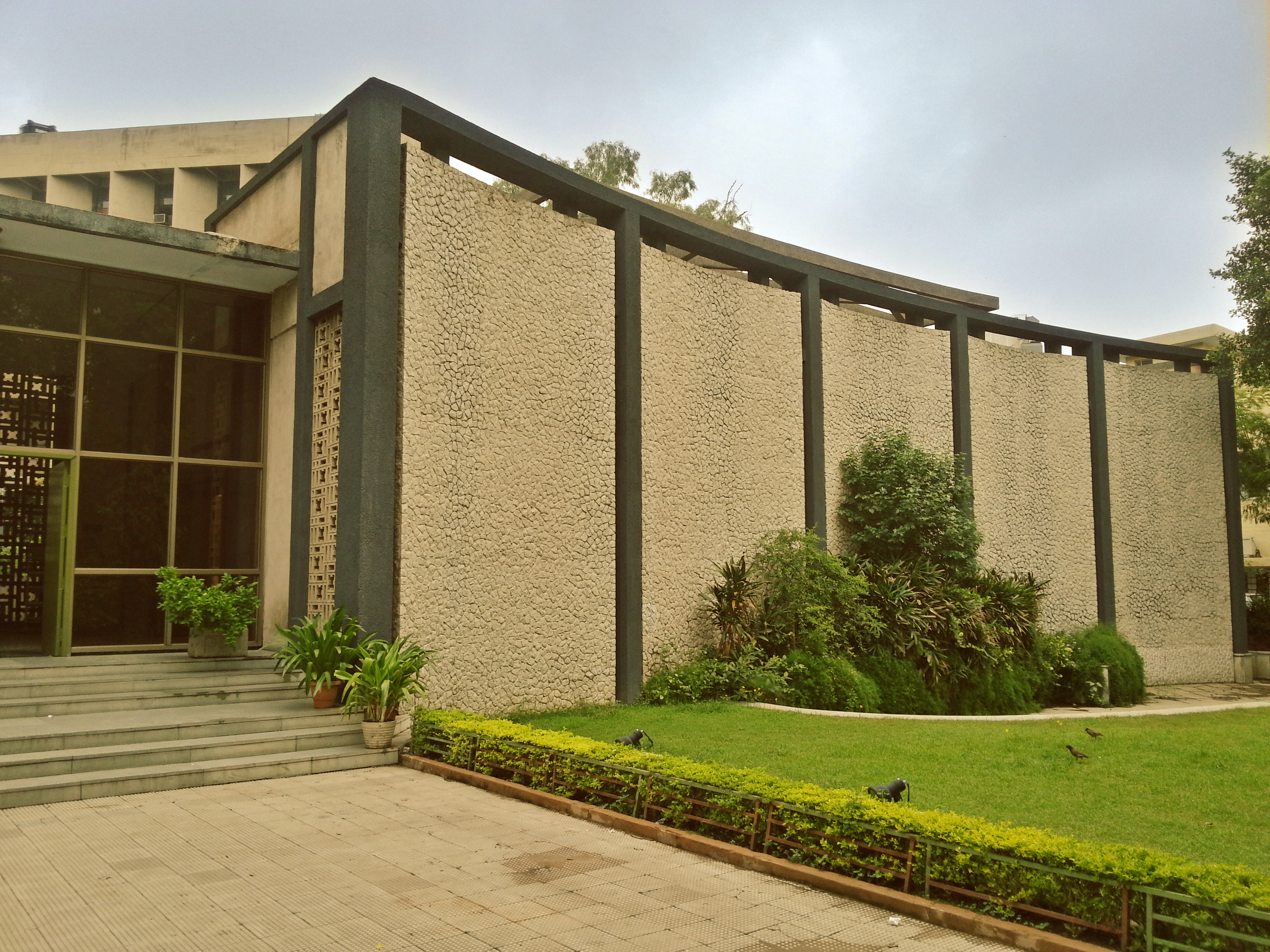
Triveni Kala Sangam and Shridharani Art Gallery facade on the left, New Delhi, 1963.

== Work in India ==
In 1952 he moved to India and became head of the department of architecture at the Bengal Engineering College in Calcutta. He worked in New Delhi from 1955 onwards, starting with another American architect, Benjamin Polk and even after retirement in 1995, continued to design for the architecture firm he founded. In 1954, Stein along with his students, presented designs for low-costing housing using brick and adobe for urban and rural structures respectively. The presentation in Delhi, along with Stein's affiliation with Benjamin Polk brought him into the limelight and earned him projects in emerging industrial towns in India such as Jamshedpur, Rourkela, and Durgapur. In 1955, Stein set up his firm in New Delhi, called Joseph Allen Stein and Associates. In 1977, he concluded his stint as an independent by joining as a partner with Bhalla and Doshi. In the 40 years of his career in India, he worked with the likes of Prime Minister Jawaharlal Nehru, Ford and Rockefeller Foundations, introducing innovative methods of construction with concrete and local stone to the Indian landscape.

The socialist ethos of the public-works department in Nehru's government gave Stein the opportunity to actualise his plans for Ladera, except in a different context. After his three-year long teaching stint in Durgapur, Stein moved to Delhi to work on government commissioned projects, starting with the Australian High Commission and Gandhi Bhavan in Delhi University. Both these structures were characterised by Stein's signature use of pour-over concrete, as well as a local quartzite for stairs, piers, walls. The local quartzite was cut into pentagons and arranged in rows as a homage to straight, geometrical design which Stein had inherited from the Bay area tradition. This was offset by concrete shells mimicking Mughal domes, and clay tiles by local artisans which gave these designs an Indian touch. Stein's work in India was keen to bring together dualities of the local and the global, the inside and the outside. He was inspired by Gandhi who envisioned, "the possibility of combining simplicity and science, industry and agriculture" to present a model for progress.

Over the years, he brought in 'California modernism' to several buildings he designed in Delhi, including, the Ford Foundation headquarters and the India International Centre (IIC) (1962), United Nations Children's Fund (UNICEF), the World Wide Fund for Nature, a conservatory within Lodi Gardens (with Garret Eckbo), Gandhi-King Plaza, an open-air memorial in IIC, Triveni Kala Sangam at Mandi House, the American Embassy School and the Australian high commission in Chanakyapuri. Among his notable buildings outside Delhi was the Express Towers, the first high rise built in India, and at the time it was completed, the tallest building in South Asia. In 2008, the Indian International centre was voted the best building in Delhi by Outlook India in a magazine poll conducted among local architect. India Habitat Centre, also designed by Stein was at a close second. Projects like the Indian International Centre, which was to be a landmark in India's cultural zeitgeist, were being promoted Prime Minister Jawaharlal Nehru to establish India's relevance globally. Expatriate architects from Britain, America, Germany, and Russia were competing to gain prominence in India's urban landscape, where a global convergence was made possible by Nehru's participation Non Aligned Movement. Stein was able to rise to popularity since he could bring the Nehruvian vision for modern India to life on a budget, given the conditions of technological limitations and financial corruption that pervaded the new nation.

From the last leg of his career, after joining Bhalla and Doshi in 1977, two projects stand out: Institute for Crop Research in the Semi-Arid Tropics (ICRISAT) in Hyderabad and Kashmir Conference Center in Srinagar. Both these projects were ecologically attuned in interesting ways. ICRISAT being a scientific facility that was built to preserve strands of rare grains was climate-controlled by integrating electrical systems into "waffle-slabs", a salient feature of its architecture. On the other hand, the Kashmir Conference Center, located on the banks of the Dal Lake, is the first instance of lake-sourced cooling in India. Stein also chose to use concrete instead of wood, which is the traditional choice of material in Kashmir, to save the local Deodar Cedar that grew by the lake.

== Legacy ==
Several of his disciples went on to establish leading architectural firms and real estate development businesses; J. K. Jain (architect & real estate developer), chairman at DASNAC; Anuraag Chowfla and Meena Mani (architects), principals at Mani & Chowfla, to name a few. In 1993, Building in the Garden, a study of his work, by Stephen White, dean of the School of Architecture at Roger Williams University in Rhode Island was published. White notes that even though Stein's work in India is celebrated, their intent and scope is not fully recognised. The purpose of writing the book is to shed light on the philosophy behind Stein's designs.

Stein was awarded the Padma Shri, India's fourth highest civilian honour, in 1992. He married Margaret Suydam in 1938. He died on 6 October 2001, at age 89 in Raleigh, North Carolina. He is survived by their sons David and Ethan. In 2022, Stein's family contributed materials from his personal archive to the Division of Rare and Manuscript Collections at Cornell University. These materials included “5,000 drawings, firm brochures, publications, and other documents from over 70 years of Stein's professional life”, some of which were exhibited at the Bibliowicz Family Gallery in Milstein Hall to celebrate the man. UC Berkeley's Environmental Design Archives also contain Stein's blueprints of a mid-century modern house in Mill Valley, California, which was considered a "lost project" until they were donated by former resident of the house, Bill Rogan's son, Dennis.

== Selected projects ==
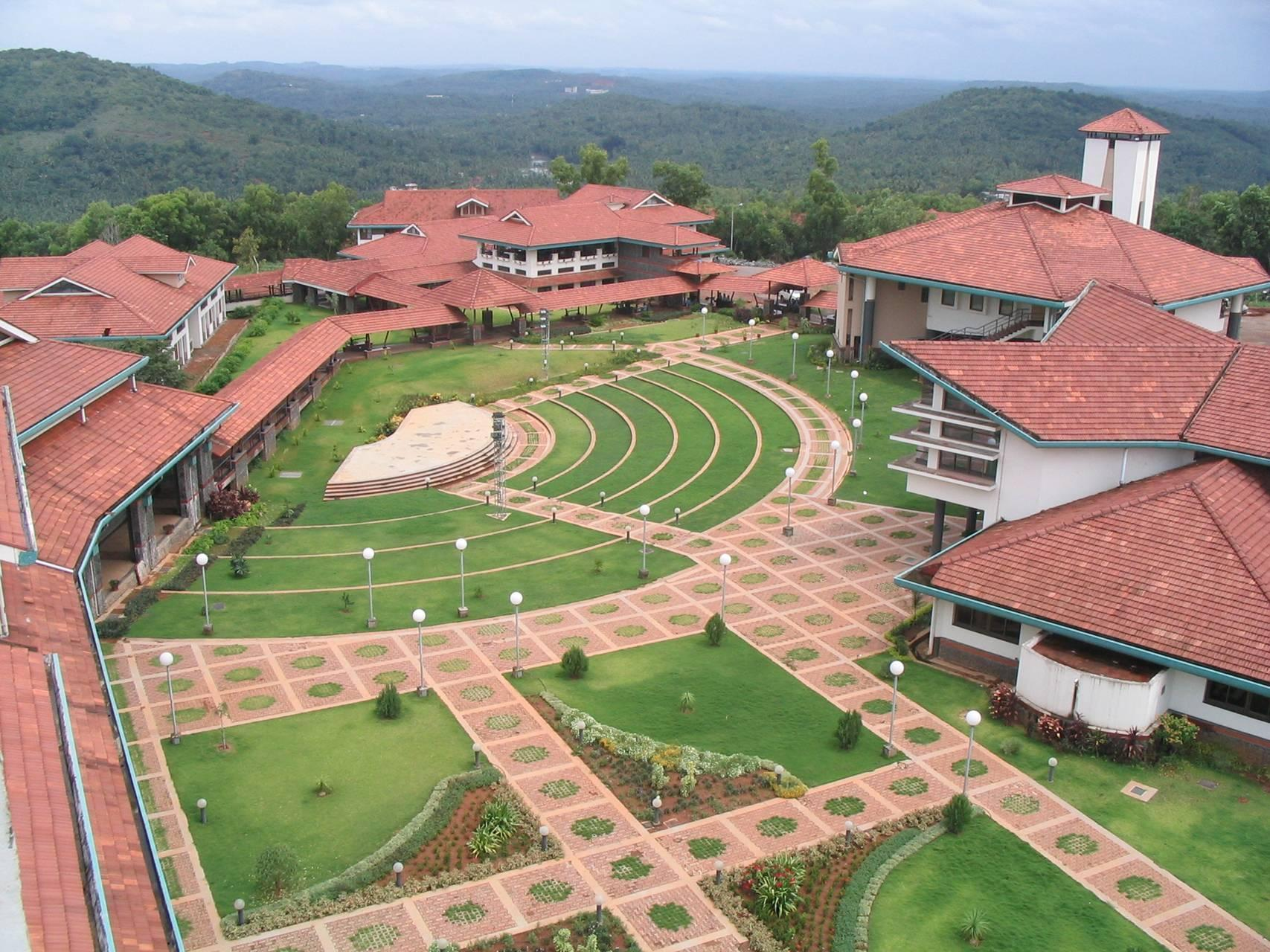
Indian Institute of Management Kozhikode, the fifth IIM to be established in the prestigious IIM family, started construction of hilltop campus in 2001 and was completed by 2003.

- 1940: "One Family Defense House" (with Gregory Ain), unbuilt
- 1940: "Low-Cost House", unbuilt
- 1947: Ladera Cooperative (with John Funk; landscape architect: Garrett Eckbo), Palo Alto, California
- 1950: 70 Summit Ave, Mill Valley, landscape architect: Lawrence Halprin - under threat to be redeveloped
- 1955: Planning of Durgapur, West Bengal, India along with Benjamin Polk.
- 1968: Indian Express Towers, Nariman Point, Mumbai, relandscaping of Lodi Gardens, along with Garrett Eckbo.
- Several buildings in Lodi Estate, New Delhi, including the headquarters of the Ford Foundation, Unicef and the World Wide Fund for Nature, a conference centre called the India International Center (1959–62), and the India Habitat Center for housing and environmental studies.
- Indian Institute of Management Kozhikode campus, Kerala, India.
- Triveni Kala Sangam Arts Centre, New Delhi, India.
- Several factories with roofs inspired by the domes used in traditional Indian architecture
- Kashmir Conference Center, India.
- 1962 – General Education Centre, now Cultural Education Centre for Performing Arts Kennedy House Complex of Aligarh Muslim University, India. www.cecamu.in
- Four factories for Escorts Ltd., Faridabad, India
- American Embassy School, New Delhi, India.
- Delhi Public School, Gurgaon (now Gurugram)

== Notes ==
- White, Stephen (1993), Building in the Garden: The Architecture of Joseph Allen Stein in India and California, Oxford University Press, ISBN 0-19-562924-8
- The architecture of Joseph Allen Stein in India and California, by Stephen White, Oxford University Press, 1993.
- The responsibility for the environment: First address, 9 October 1962, by Joseph Allen Stein. University of California, College of Environmental Design, 1962.
