= Pitakataik (Yangon) =

- ပိဋကတ်တိုက်
- Location within Myanmar
- Alternative names: Buddhist Tripitaka Library

General information
- Status: Completed
- Type: Library, religious archive
- Architectural style: Modernist with Buddhist symbolic elements
- Location: Kaba Aye Pagoda Road, Mayangon Township, Yangon, Myanmar
- Coordinates: 16.861111550882388°N 96.1531642638215°E
- Construction started: 1956
- Completed: 1961
- Opened: 1961
- Client: U Nu (Prime Minister of Burma)

Technical details
- Structural system: Reinforced concrete
- Floor count: 3

Design and construction
- Architects: Benjamin Polk, Joseph Allen Stein

Piṭakataik (also known as the Buddhist Tripitaka Library) is a Buddhist library located within the Kaba Aye Pagoda complex, Yangon, Myanmar. It was commissioned by Prime Minister U Nu in the 1950s to preserve Buddhist scriptures and writings related to the Sixth Buddhist Synod. It continues to store thousands of original Buddhist folding-book manuscripts.

== History ==
Prime Minister U Nu planned the library to keep Pāli scriptures from Theravāda Buddhist countries and other religious texts from the Sixth Buddhist Synod held in Rangoon between 1954 and 1956. The building was designed by Benjamin Polk, an American architect who had moved to India and later worked with Joseph Allen Stein in New Delhi. Polk incorporated Buddhist symbols and elements of traditional Burmese architecture into the library's Modernist design.

Construction began around c. 1955 – c. 1956 and was supervised by Indian site manager Visvanath Jhanjee. The project faced several difficulties, including the murder of a Chinese carpenter foreman, the removal of the first site engineer because of a drinking problem, and political changes after General Ne Win replaced U Nu as prime minister between 1958 and 1960.

The library was completed around 1960–61, when U Nu had re-elected to office.

== Design ==
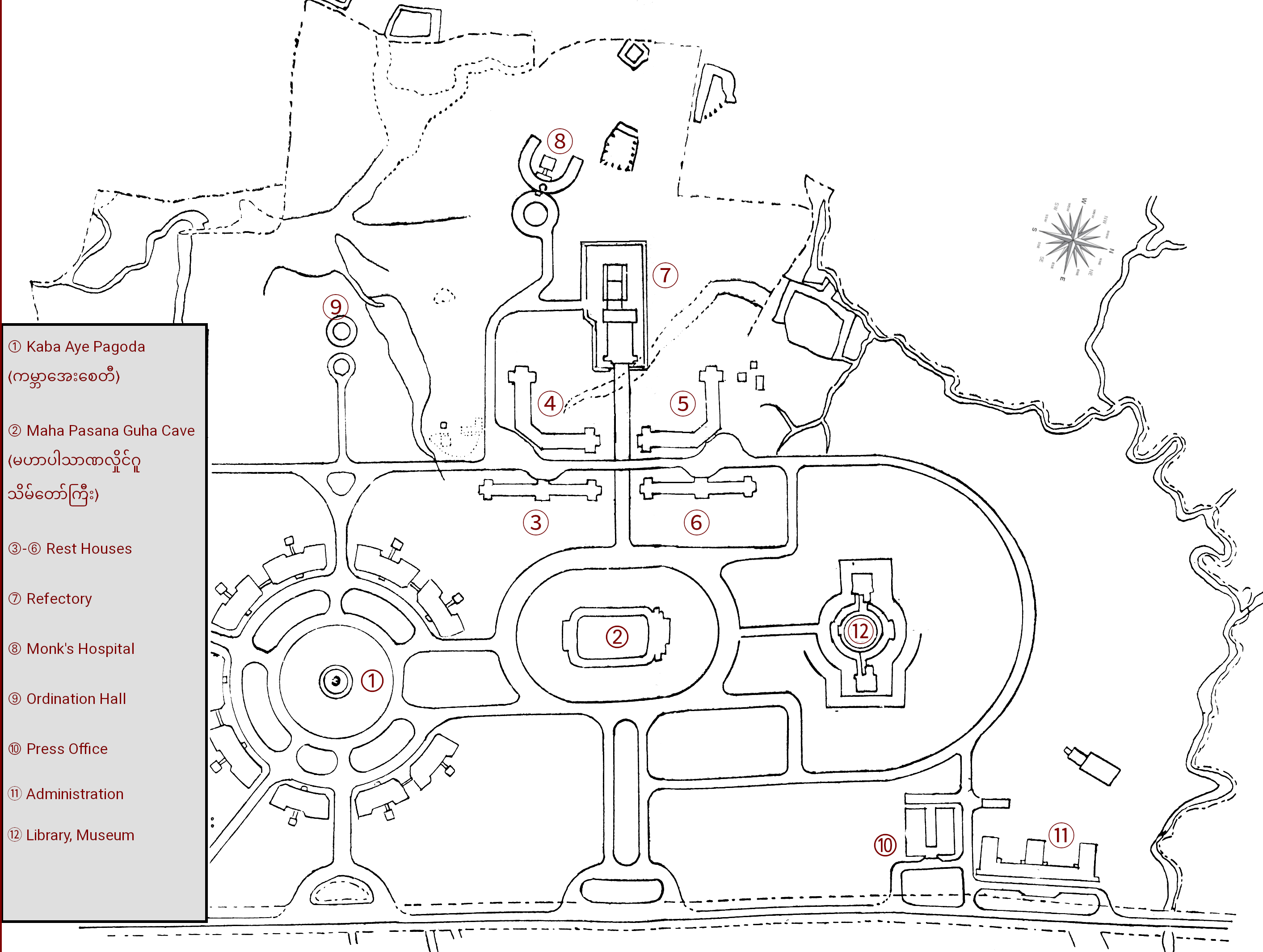
Map of Kaba Aye Pagoda complex

The library is known for its radial design, which was influenced by traditional stupa architecture, particularly the Sanchi Stupa in Madhya Pradesh, India. The building was constructed with reinforced concrete, allowing architect Benjamin Polk to use cantilevers and recessed pointed arches inspired by traditional Burmese architecture studied in Bagan. The design also incorporates Buddhist symbolism, including a three-story structure representing the Buddhist principles of impermanence, suffering, and insubstantiality, and two large cast stone lotus flowers at the main entrance. The library was originally surrounded by landscaped gardens and an artificial lake, which gave the building a more ceremonial appearance.
