= Hilton Towers =

Hilton Towers, Hilton & Towers or Hilton Tower may refer to:

- Hilton & Towers Chicago, former name of Hilton Chicago
- Hilton Towers Mumbai, former name of Trident Nariman Point Mumbai Hotel
- Pittsburgh Hilton & Towers, former name of Wyndham Grand Pittsburgh Downtown
- Beetham Tower, Manchester, also called Hilton Tower
