= Garrett Eckbo =

American architect (1910–2000)

Garrett Eckbo (November 28, 1910 – May 14, 2000) was an American landscape architect notable for his seminal 1950 book Landscape for Living.

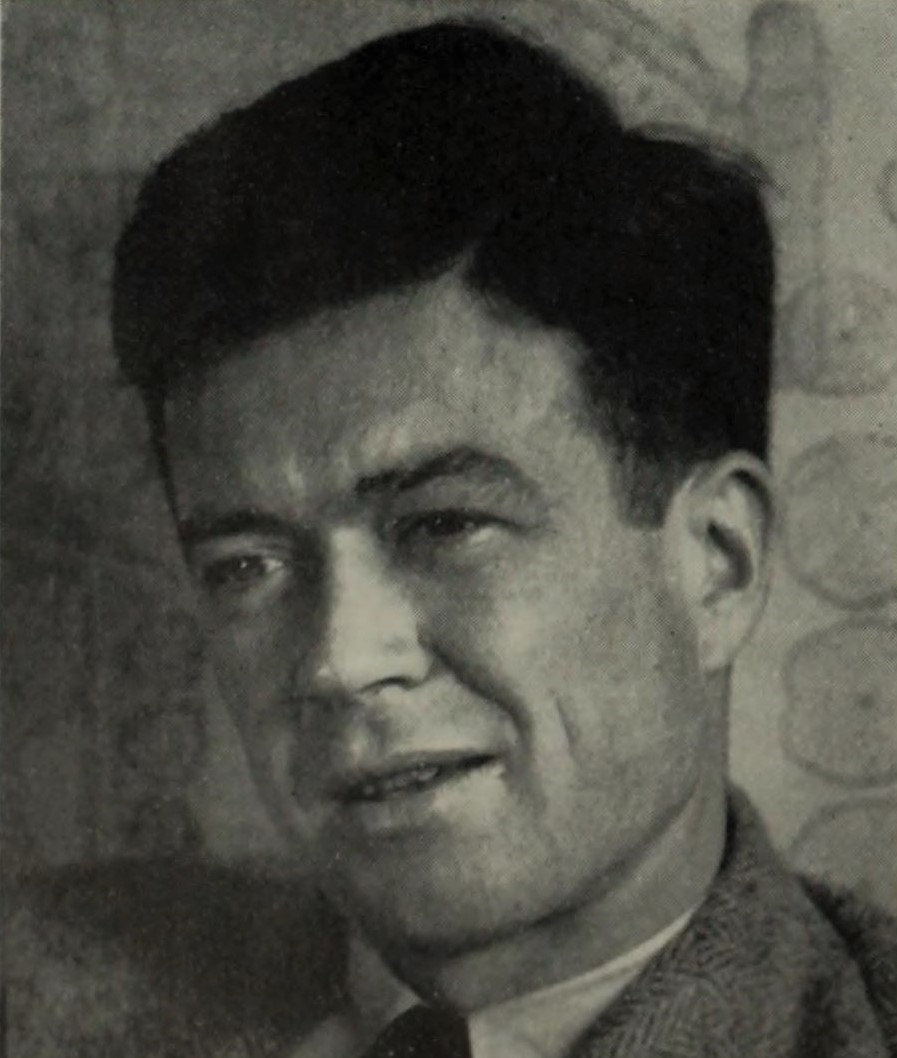
Garrett Eckbo by Imogen Cunningham, 1946

Eckbo, Dean, Royston, Williams

== Early life ==
Garrett Eckbo was born in Cooperstown, New York, to Axel Eckbo, a businessman, and Theodora Munn Eckbo. In 1912, the family moved to Chicago, Illinois. After Eckbo's parents divorced, he and his mother relocated to Alameda, California, where they struggled financially while he grew up. After Eckbo graduated from high school in 1929, he felt a lack of ambition and direction and went to stay with a wealthy paternal uncle, Eivind Eckbo, in Norway. It was during his stay in Norway that he began to focus on his future. Once he returned to the U.S., he worked for several years at various jobs saving money so that he could attend college.

== Education ==
After attending Marin Junior College for a year, he enrolled at the University of California, Berkeley where he majored in landscape architecture.

While Eckbo was at Berkeley he was influenced by two of the programs faculty members, H. Leland Vaughan and Thomas Church, who inspired him to move beyond the formalized beaux-arts style that was popular at the time. The Beaux Arts-movement is defined as being carefully planned, richly decorated and being influenced by classical art and architecture. Eckbo graduated with a B.S. in landscape architecture in 1935 and subsequently worked at Armstrong Nurseries in Ontario near Los Angeles where he designed about a hundred gardens in less than a year. After working at the Nurseries, he was restless to expand his creative horizons and entered Harvard University's Graduate School of Design by way of a scholarship competition, which he won.

Beginning his studies at Harvard, Eckbo found that the curriculum followed the Beaux-Arts method and was similar to the one at Berkeley but more rigidly entrenched. Eckbo, along with fellow students Dan Kiley and James Rose resisted and began to "explore science, architecture, and art as sources for a modern landscape design." Eckbo began to take architecture classes with the former Bauhaus director Walter Gropius, who was then head of the architecture department while continuing to take classes in the landscape architecture department. Gropius and Marcel Breuer introduced Eckbo to the idea of the social role in architecture, the link between society and spatial design.

Eckbo was also influenced by the works of several abstract painters, including Wassily Kandinsky, László Moholy-Nagy and Kasimir Malevich. Eckbo would convey a sense of movement in his designs by the layering and massing of plants as inspired by the artists' paintings.

== Professional work and philosophy ==
After receiving his MLA degree from Harvard in 1938, Eckbo returned to California where he worked in the San Francisco Office of the Farm Security Administration. He designed camps for the migrant agricultural workers in California's Central Valley. He applied his modernist ideas to these camps attempting to improve the workers living environments. "'The Grapes of Wrath' was our bible," he said of John Steinbeck's 1939 novel about farmers dislocated by the dust bowl. "The F.S.A. was a remarkable experience because it had the really creative atmosphere a public agency can have if it's not inhibited by some frustrating force."

Those major organizational plantings of Chinese elms, cottonwoods, mulberries, sycamores and other hardy species were softened with magnolias, oaks and olives for shade and almond and plum trees for color. The landscape architect sees nothing extraordinary about going to such trouble for the dispossessed. "You were conscious of social problems that existed, and you tried to think of ways to improve them," he said.

During World War II, the agency shifted its focus to housing for defense workers. Mr. Eckbo designed site plans for 50 such settlements on the West Coast. But peace brought a different public attitude. "There were products we wanted to buy, things we wanted to do, a great outflow of energy, demand and desire. Prosperity is bad for morale," he said. "It makes us greedy."

Mr. Eckbo had a leading hand in planning what many scholars consider the postwar period's finest subdivision scheme, the 256-acre Ladera Housing Cooperative near Palo Alto. But the project was never fully realized without Federal Housing Authority financing, which was probably withheld because the community was racially integrated.

In 1940, Eckbo joined with his brother–in-law, Edward Williams to form the firm Eckbo and Williams. Five years later Robert Royston joined the firm.

In 1946, Eckbo resettled in Los Angeles to take advantage of its growing opportunities for private practice. Never a puritan, he threw himself with gusto into defining the landscape of a new American dream. "L.A. is larger, looser, a place of freer movement socially than the Bay Area," he said. "The years I spent there were the best of my professional life."

Mr. Eckbo's eagerness to experiment during the 1950s was epitomized by his theatrical Beverly Hills swimming pool design for the owner of Cole of California, the bathing suit company. The landscape architect cantilevered a steel beam spanning the width of the pool to support a masonry wall and a series of concrete diving platforms that allowed models to swim under the backdrop unnoticed and then emerge like Esther Williams from the deep.

In other projects, Mr. Eckbo advanced the quintessential California mode of indoor-outdoor living, casual recreation and the flexible use of space. "In the landscape profession," Mr. Eckbo explained, "small gardens are not seen as our highest aspiration. If you can do a 50-acre park, it must be more important. But for me the private garden has always been a laboratory for developing new ideas and concepts. Any family that has a quarter-acre backyard has got a real project. Any improvement of any space is a step forward."

Many of Eckbo's gardens accompanied well known leading modernist architect housing design, including Raphael Soriano, Richard Neutra and Robert Alexander (including Orange Coast College and were photographed by Julius Shulman.

In 1956, the Aluminum Company of America (ALCOA) asked Eckbo to create a garden containing large amounts of aluminum, for the company's publicity purposes. Aluminum had been widely used during the war years as a component in airplane manufacture, but ALCOA was interested in promoting the metal's peacetime use as well.

In 1963, he returned to Berkeley to head the department of landscape architecture where he had been a student.

The successful firm of Eckbo, Royston and Williams designed hundreds of projects including residential gardens, planned community developments, urban plazas, churches and college campuses.

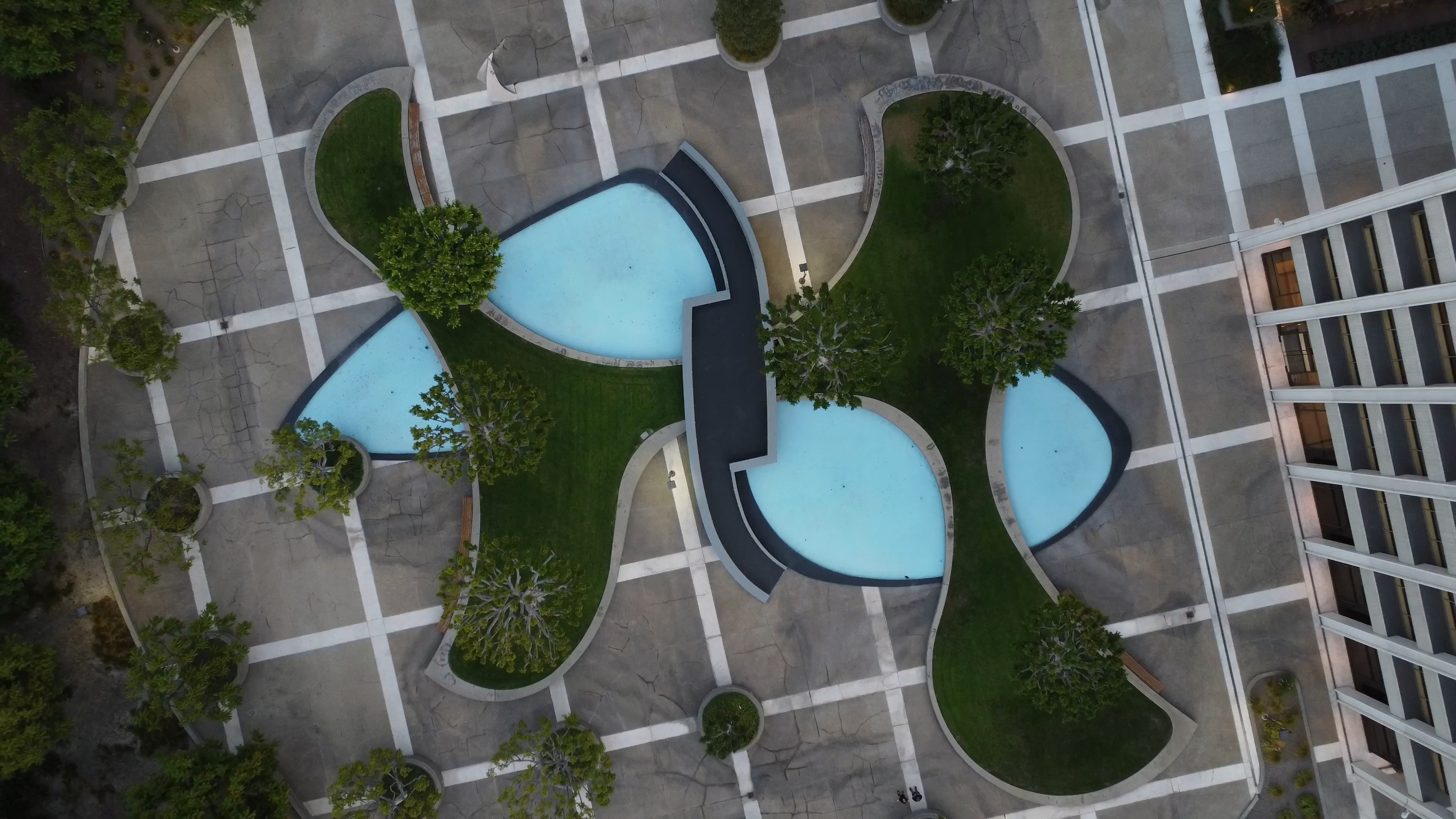
An aerial view of the landscape at Union Bank Plaza

He would eventually form the highly successful firm Eckbo, Dean, Austin and Williams in 1964, which in 1973, officially adopted the moniker, EDAW. Guided by a progressive vision of the leadership role of landscape architecture, EDAW became involved in sustainable planning at the regional scale as early as the 1960s when the firm created the California Urban Metropolitan Open Space Plan for the State.

In a period in history when suburban sprawl was ascendant, EDAW's open space plan for the state of California was as innovative as it was provocative. The very idea of an "open space plan" was a novel one. The firm drew up plans to preserve open spaces in danger of encroachment on the fringes of the greater Los Angeles-San Diego, Palm Springs, San Francisco Bay and Lake Tahoe areas. In addition to protected county, state and federal lands existing at the time, EDAW's plan identified a further 330,000 acres for protection. In strong language, it warned against the automobile and foretold the climate crisis. "A new ethical attitude about land use is needed," intoned EDAW's report, "in order to protect the environment for everyone’s benefit."

EDAW also began to work internationally, with projects in New Delhi, India (Lodi Park and the Ford Foundation Headquarters) and Osaka, Japan (Civic Center) among other locations worldwide. Eckbo famously said: "design shall be dynamic, not static. Design shall be areal, not axial. Design shall be three dimensional, people live in volumes, not planes."

Growth in the firm continued apace in the 1970s and '80s, with new satellite offices in Alexandria, Virginia, and Atlanta, Georgia. In 1979 Eckbo left EDAW, the firm he helped to found. EDAW was acquired by AECOM Technology Corporation in 2005, whose work continuously strives to include cross-disciplinary work and link environmental and social goals to improve quality of life.

Leaving the firm in 1979, Eckbo first formed the firm Garrett Eckbo and Associates and finally Eckbo Kay Associates with Kenneth Kay.

Throughout Eckbo's career he maintained his vision of the interaction of art and science to create environments that were functional and livable, while maintaining the social, ecological and cultural approach to design.

In 1964, he was elected into the National Academy of Design as an Associate member, and became a full Academician in 1994. In 1968, he signed the "Writers and Editors War Tax Protest" pledge, vowing to refuse tax payments in protest against the Vietnam War.

He received numerous awards, including UC Berkeley's College of Environmental Design Distinguished Alumnus of 1998, the American Society of Landscape Architects Medal of Honor in 1975, the Architectural League of New York's gold medal in 1950 and the American Institute of Architect's merit award in 1953. In 1970, he won an American Society of Landscape Architects' merit award for Lodi Park in New Delhi, India.

"Art emotionalizes the intellect. Science intellectualizes the emotions. Together, they bring order to nature and freedom to man," he wrote in his 1969 book, The Landscape We See.

"Today, one finds the center of city or town only by the increasing height of buildings, the increasing clamor of lights and signs, and the increasing congestion of traffic," he wrote. "We still build temples and palaces and many other splendid structures, but they are lost in the modern urban jungle."

"Over the years I've done a lot of flying across the country," he said in an interview to Martin Filler of the New York Times, "and from an airplane it looks as if nobody knew what they were doing or where they were building. There's a near total absence of physical community in America today, no sequence of qualitative connections and experiences. What we landscape architects are about is to try to bring some intelligence to that pattern."

Eckbo produced more than 1,000 varied schemes for clients ranging from migrant farm workers in California's Central Valley to celebrities such as Gary Cooper in Beverly Hills. But despite his role in creating a new style of American landscape design during the postwar years, Mr. Eckbo is still not as widely known outside certain practical and academic architectural and landscape circles.

Other books by Eckbo include Landscape for Living and Urban Landscape Design.

Linda Jewell, professor of landscape architecture at the University of California, Berkeley, where Eckbo taught said Eckbo's books always contained numerous illustrations of his observations and theoretical positions. Some of the illustrations reflected actual projects, others were proposals that Eckbo thought should be real, she said.

"He was always an advocate for the underclass," she said. "Everything he did had a social agenda behind it."

Eckbo died on May 14, 2000, after a stroke. He was survived by his wife, Arline, of Oakland; daughters Marilyn Kweskin and Alison Peper of Los Angeles; six grandchildren and two great-grandchildren.

== Selected projects ==
- 1935: Landscape design for architect Edwin Lewis Snyder, Berkeley, CA
- 1938-44: Housing for migrant workers in California, Arizona and Texas
- 1946: Park Planned Homes (architect: Gregory Ain), Altadena, CA
- 1947-48: Community Homes (architect: Gregory Ain), Reseda, CA (unbuilt)
- 1947: Ladera Cooperative (architects: John Funk and Joseph Allen Stein), Palo Alto, CA
- 1948: Avenel Homes (architect: Gregory Ain), Los Angeles, CA
- 1948: Mar Vista Housing (architect: Gregory Ain), Los Angeles, CA
- 1950: Zimmerman House, Brentwood, Los Angeles, CA - site bought and house demolished by Chris Pratt and Katherine Schwarzenegger 2024.
- 1952: Alcoa Forecast Garden (Eckbo residence), Los Angeles, CA
- 1962: Long-range development plan for the University of New Mexico
- 1964-68: Union Bank Plaza (architect: Harrison & Abramovitz), Los Angeles, CA
- 1966: Fulton Mall, Fresno, California
- 1968: Lodhi Garden (architect: Joseph Allen Stein), New Delhi, India
- 1970: Tucson Community Center, Tucson, AZ

== Teaching ==
Eckbo taught at the School of Architecture at the University of Southern California from 1948 to 1956. Among his students were architect Frank Gehry. Gehry credits Eckbo and Simon Eisner, who taught city planning, in encouraging him to follow his "liberal political do-gooder leanings" and apply to Harvard Graduate School of Design for graduate work in city planning: "they also knew I wasn't interested in doing rich guys' houses and that I would be more emotionally inclined toward low-cost housing and planning."

He was the chairman of the Department of Landscape Architecture at UC Berkeley from 1963 to 1969.

Eckbo's social inquiry techniques, environmental, landscape and living teachings have continued to exert influence internationally through the practice of the firms he founded, including the large and international EDAW / AECOM and international students at UC Berkeley, such as Mexican architect and landscape architect Mario Schjetnan.

At the request of UC Berkeley's Institute of Governmental Studies, Eckbo wrote "Public Landscape," ranking architectural and planning successes and failures from the public arena.

In 1997, the UC Berkeley Art Museum mounted a "Garrett Eckbo: Landscape for Living" exhibit.

Though he gave up designing when he turned 80, he continued to write for several years after, including People in a Landscape, a summation of humanistic principles that at the time in the decade of the late 1990s may have seemed novel to a generation that grew up in a very different climate for design in the public realm than the social and economic transformations Eckbo lived through during the Great Depression and post war period.

The alleged guardians of the landscape look at what we call good sense as an intrusion on their prerogatives, Mr. Eckbo said. That's the feeling put out by the people who make money by putting it out, in the true spirit of enterprise. What should happen in the next century is a developing understanding of the basic relations between society and nature. There is a social ideal that's badly mangled but still around -- that we should all work together cooperatively. That's a simple and powerful idea.

== Publications ==
- 1950: Landscape for Living (Duell, Sloan & Pearce)
  - "a seminal book in landscape architecture"
  - republished in 2002 (Hennessey & Ingalls)
- 1956: Art of Home Landscaping (McGraw-Hill)
- 1964: Urban Landscape Design (McGraw-Hill)
- 1969: The Landscape We See (McGraw-Hill)

== Additional sources ==
- Francis, M. & Hester, R. T. Jr. (eds): The Meaning of Gardens. Cambridge, MA: The MIT Press; 1990. ISBN 0-262-06127-9
- Rogers, E. B.: Landscape Design: a Cultural and Architectural History. New York, NY: Harry Abrams, Inc.; 2001. ISBN 0-8109-4253-4
- Simon, Libby (Summer 2019). "Eckbo in Wonderland: Housing and Landscaping for the Planned Community". Eden: Journal of the California Garden & Landscape History Society. 22 (3): 6–21.
- Treib, M & Imbert, D: 'Garrett Eckbo: Modern Landscapes for Living'. University of California Press, 1997. ISBN 0520207793 ISBN 978-0520207790
