= Edwin Lewis Snyder =

American architect

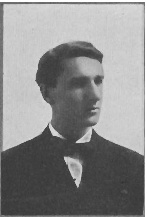
- Born: July 2, 1887; Stockton, California
- Died: March 28, 1969 (aged 81); Lodi, California
- Education: University of California, Berkeley
- Occupation: Architect
- Spouse: Dorian Ethel Wright

Edwin Lewis Snyder (July 2, 1887 – March 28, 1969) was an architect and pioneer in the use of Spanish Colonial Revival Style architecture who designed homes in Northern California from the early to mid-twentieth century. The Snyder-designed Berkeley Community YWCA, built in 1930, is on the city's historical register; the Roy O. Long Co. Building, built in 1927, is on the California Historical Resources Inventory. Along with Frederick L. Confer (designer of the Tao House), Snyder designed several “western colonial” homes during the Depression. In 1932, Snyder designed the 7,700-square-foot (720 m^{2}) Alpha Delta Pi sorority house in Berkeley; excluding architect’s fees, the English cottage-style structure cost $27,500 (equivalent to $341,106 in 2025).

== Biography ==
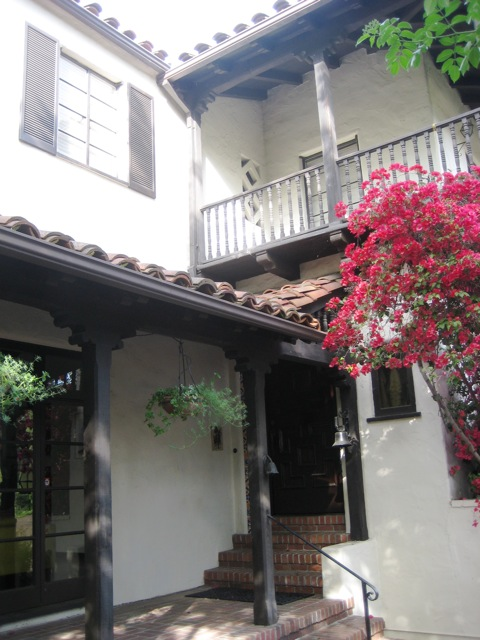
Loggia typical of Snyder's 1920s houses.

Snyder was born on July 2, 1887, in Stockton, California. He married Dorian Ethel Wright on January 18, 1913, in San Francisco, California. He received his degree in architecture from the University of California, Berkeley in 1909. He was strongly influenced by a six-week visit to Majorca, a Spanish island in the Mediterranean, where he visited Palma (Majorca), Deià, Estellencs, and Formentor. He found homes he described as “architecturally perfect” featuring pergolas, Dado (architecture), tile roofs, windows that ran to the floor, with white-washed finishes. These features were included in his later works in California.

Snyder’s designs placed first and second in the 1932 Small House Exhibition in Oakland, California. The first-place award was for a ranch house built for his colleague Confer; it featured typical traits of early California architecture, including a clay tile roof, a large brick fireplace, and a sunroom. In 1935, editors of Sunset Magazine reviewed the design of Snyder's own home, writing: "By skillful planning and execution, Mr. Snyder has achieved a house that has all of the informal charm of a tiny cottage and at the same time the spaciousness that comes in larger dwellings." Landscape architect Garrett Eckbo designed the landscaping for the house, which has a view of the San Francisco Bay from the Berkeley Hills.

An advocate of housing for low-income families, Snyder designed low-cost homes for the National Housing Bureau. He emphasized that low-income housing should have standard design elements, but with differentiated architectural design.

A veteran of both World War I and II, Snyder operated his own architecture practice in Carmel-by-the-Sea, California, from 1942 to 1961, when he moved to Lodi, California to retire. He was a former member and past president of the Architectural Honor Society. In Carmel, he designed the Spinning Wheel Restaurant in 1952.

== Death ==
He died on March 28, 1969, in Lodi, California, at the age of 81, and was buried there.

== See also ==
- List of American architects
