= Khurshed Nariman =

Indian politician (1883–1948)

Khurshed Framji Nariman (1883 – 1948), also known as Veer Nariman, was one of the second generation of Parsi stalwarts in the Indian National Congress. He remained Mayor of Bombay from 1935 for a year.

== Life ==
After studying B.A. and L.L.B., he started his career as a lawyer, and soon his political career as a youth leader, and later with Bombay Municipality, widely supported by Vallabhbhai Patel. He came into the public eye in 1928 as an independent and courageous politician for his sensational protest against the British engineer, George Buchanan involved in the Bombay 'Backbay Reclamation' scandal. He was cited for libel, but exposed the scandalous financial arrangements in this scheme.

Nariman was later elected president of the Bombay Provincial Congress Committee and then mayor of Bombay. His Whither congress? 'Spiritual idealism' or 'political realism' some random thoughts on the Poona conference and after, published in 1933, was unpopular among members of the party.

In 1930 he was influenced by Mahatma Gandhi and organised and led the civil disobedience movement (Salt March) in Bombay and also led Bombay province contingent at the All India Congress Committee (AICC). He remained Mayor of Bombay from 1935 to 1936. However, following the provincial elections of 1937 in the Bombay Presidency in which Congress secured majority, he was passed over in the selection of the chief minister in favour of B. G. Kher. He complained of a communal bias to the party high command, but no investigation was taken up by Jawaharlal Nehru. Gandhi responded to a separate appeal, but could find no proof for Nariman's complaints.

He was expelled from the Congress party due to his vociferous but unsubstantiated charges. His attempts to reestablish himself in the freedom movement through the All India Forward Bloc (founded in 1939 by Subhas Chandra Bose) failed.

Bombay's Nariman Point is named after him. He lived at Readymoney Mansion near Horniman Circle (then Elphinstone Circle) in Mumbai, the road is now called Veer Nariman Road, after him.

== Works ==
- Harvey-Nariman Libel Case: With a Brief History of the Development Department... S. M. Surveyor, 1927.
- "Whither congress?": 'Spiritual idealism' or 'political realism,' some random thoughts on the Poona conference and after. D. R. Dewoolkar, 1933.
- What Next?. Bombay Book Depot, 1934.

== Legacy ==
- Nariman Point, a business district in South Mumbai is named after Khurshed Nariman.
