= India International Centre =

Building in New Delhi, India

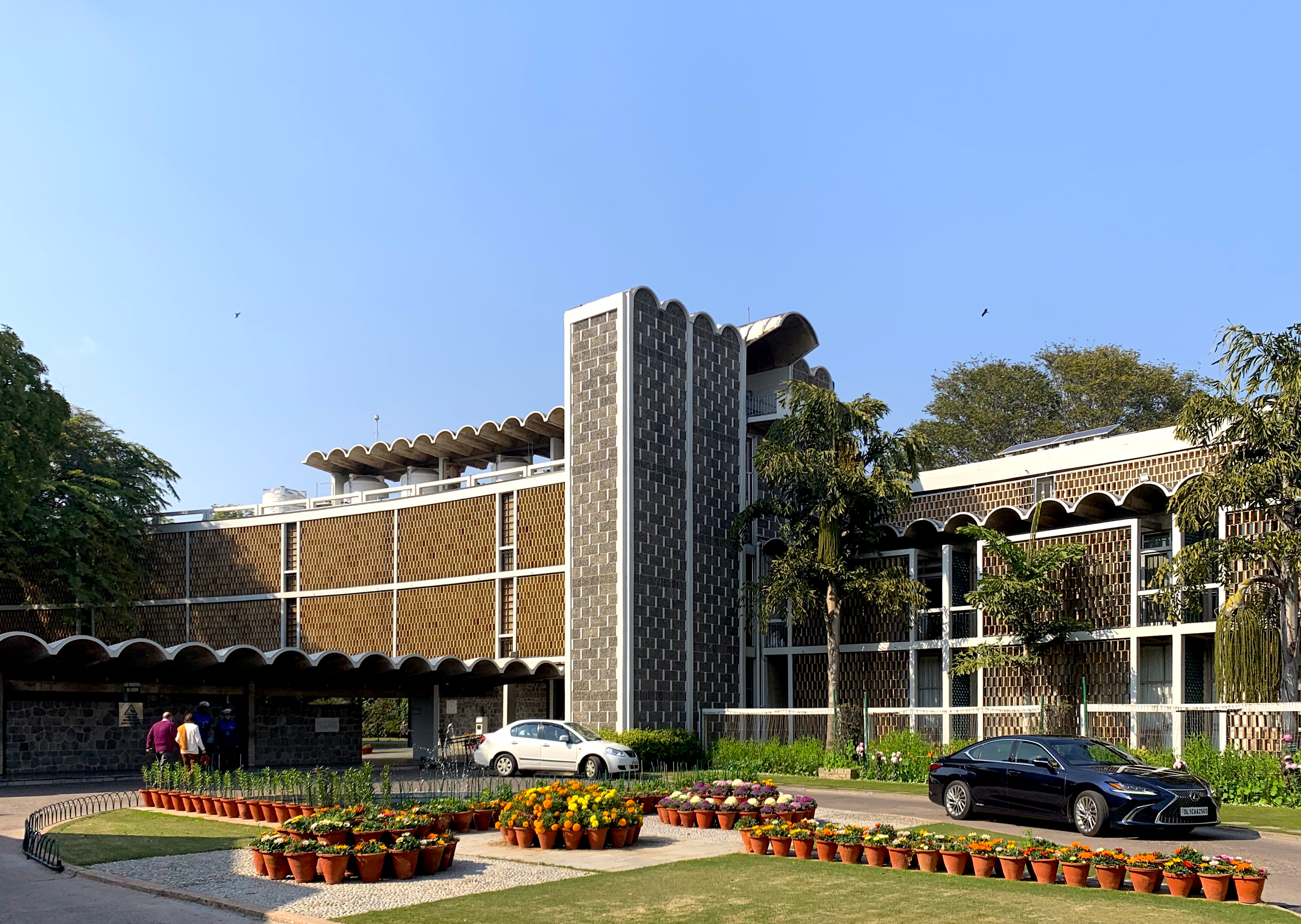
- The front entrance and driveway, January 2020
- Interactive map of the India International Centre area

General information
- Location: 40, Max Mueller Marg, New Delhi 110003, India
- Coordinates: 28.593383°N 77.222257°E
- Completed: 1962

Design and construction
- Architect: Joseph Allen Stein

Other information
- Parking: Available

The India International Centre (IIC) is a non-official organisation situated in New Delhi, India. Membership of the IIC includes artists, academicians, senior government officials, judges, jurists, parliamentarians, doctors, ministers, governors, social activists, journalists and persons from other domains. It serves as a meeting place for cultural and intellectual offerings; while maintaining its non-official character, non-aligned motivations and remains uncommitted to any particular form of governmental, political, economic or religious affiliation.

The centre's main complex and its annex (located adjacent to Lodhi Gardens) were designed by the architect Joseph Allen Stein. There are several other major institutions around the centre, which are also designed by Stein, giving the area the popular name of 'Steinabad'.

== Overview ==
According to its official blurb, the centre is alluded to as 'Triveni', which in Sanskrit means 'a structure of three', as it provides three main activity streams:

- The Intellectual Stream, which is supported by a well-stocked library that helps scholars and researchers, and the continuing series of the organisation of seminars, symposia, meetings and discussions. The Publications Division brings out the IIC Quarterly, the internationally known multi-disciplinary journal, and monographs known as Occasional Publications.
- The Cultural Stream comprises dance and music recitals, exhibitions, film screenings and theatre.
- The Social Stream brings together people in a pleasant setting, who stay in the hostel and use the catering facilities.

The centre has remained self-reliant for nearly six decades, although it receives funding for specific projects from government agencies including the Indian Renewable Energy Development Agency.

== History ==
The centre's foundation stone was laid in 1960 by Japanese Prince Akihito, who had come to India for his honeymoon; it was inaugurated in 1962 by S. Radhakrishnan, the 2nd President of India. The founding President of the IIC was C.D. Deshmukh, Cabinet Minister and former Governor of the Reserve Bank of India. The centre's annex was inaugurated in 1996 by Karan Singh, the president of IIC.

The centre has been known for hosting lectures and discourses by renowned international personalities which have included the Dalai Lama, UN Secretary General Kofi Annan, Archbishop Desmond Tutu, Rev Jesse Jackson, Noam Chomsky, Salman Rushdie, US Secretary of State Mike Pompeo, former Hong Kong governor Christopher Patten, Lee Kuan Yew of Singapore and many other eminent persons.

The centre's Gandhi-King Plaza, named after Mahatma Gandhi and Martin Luther King Jr., was inaugurated on 21 January 1970 by Prime Minister Indira Gandhi.

Former chief minister of Bihar, and then minister of railways Lalu Yadav was not admitted as a member in 2006, following which Karan Singh resigned as a Life Trustee, in reaction to the refusal by the admissions committee.

In March 2019, the President of India, Ram Nath Kovind, who has been conferred honorary membership, visited the IIC on the invitation of the IIC President N.N. Vohra, former governor of Jammu and Kashmir, to be introduced to the members of the centre's board of trustees.

== See also ==
- India Habitat Centre
