= World Trade Centre Pune =

World Trade Center Pune

General information
- Status: Operational
- Type: Commercial office complex
- Location: Kharadi, Pune, Maharashtra, India, Dholepatil Farms Road, Kharadi
- Opened: 2013
- Owner: Panchshil Realty
- Management: World Trade Center Pune

Technical details
- Floor area: 2.1 million sq ft

Design and construction
- Developer: Panchshil Realty
- Known for: Part of the World Trade Centers Association network

World Trade Center Pune (WTC Pune) is a commercial office complex located in Kharadi, Pune, Maharashtra, India. It is part of the World Trade Centers Association (WTCA), a network of facilities in various cities worldwide intended to promote international trade and business connections. The Pune center is one of four operational WTCs in India.

== History and development ==
The complex was developed by Panchshil Realty and was inaugurated in 2013. WTC Pune operates under the World Trade Centers Association, headquartered in New York City, United States.

WTC Pune comprises multiple office towers covering approximately 2.1 million square feet of floor space. The structures are designed in a campus layout, with provisions for conference facilities, retail outlets, banking services, and food courts. The buildings are classified as Grade-A commercial spaces.

The complex includes:

- Tower 1 - A nine-storey structure with an approximate built-up area of 360,000 square feet.
- Tower 5 - A thirteen-storey structure with an approximate built-up area of 370,000 square feet.

Other towers in the complex vary in height and floor plate size.

In 2022, WeWork India opened a 55,000 sq ft (ca. 51 a) flexible workspace in World Trade Center Pune.

In February 2025, actor Hrithik Roshan leased 9,209 square feet (8.56 a) of commercial space in World Trade Center Pune to Regus Ruby Business Centre.

== Tenants and partnerships ==
The complex accommodates a mix of domestic and international occupiers. The World Trade Centers Association notes that global companies such as POSCO, Hyundai and ZS Associates have a presence at World Trade Center Pune. Corporate filings and employer directories list ZS Associates India Private Limited with its registered or office address at "World Trade Center, Tower 3, Kharadi, Pune", indicating use of the complex as a base for consulting and analytics operations. A branch of the State Bank of India (Pune World Trade Centre branch) operates on the first floor of Tower 1, providing on-site banking services for occupiers and visitors.

In November 2024, World Trade Center Pune launched an accelerator platform in partnership with First Rate WealthTech, described as focusing on sectors such as artificial intelligence, sustainability technology, fintech, MedTech and fast-moving consumer goods. On 26 August 2025, the center signed a memorandum of understanding with the State Secretariat of Science, Technology, and Innovation of Mato Grosso in Brazil and the Indo-Brazilian Chamber of Commerce and Industry to promote cooperation in innovation and trade, as reported through WTCA communications and related announcements.

== Connectivity ==
World Trade Center Pune is situated within Kharadi, an area identified as part of Pune’s eastern business and IT corridor, a zone that has expanded significantly with the development of large commercial and technology parks. The locality includes multiple business campuses such as Gera Commerzone and International Tech Park Pune – Kharadi, contributing to the area’s concentration of IT and commercial activity. According to its developer, the center forms part of the Panchshil Office Parks cluster, which is located along major arterial roads that link Kharadi with other commercial districts in Pune.
