= Express Towers =

25-storey building in Mumbai, India

General information
- Location: Mumbai, Marine Drive, Nariman Point, Mumbai 400021, India
- Coordinates: 18.9282°N 72.8222°E
- Current tenants: Indian Express Limited; DBS Bank; Blackstone Group; Ernst & Young; McKinsey & Company; Warburg Pincus; Wells Fargo; Indian Hotels Company Limited; Columbia University; Merrill Lynch
- Completed: 1972
- Renovated: 2008–2012
- Owner: Blackstone Group & Panchshil Realty

Height
- Height: 105 metres (344 ft)

Technical details
- Floor count: Basement+Parking+ground+25
- Floor area: 400,000 square feet (37,000 m^{2})
- Lifts/elevators: 10

Design and construction
- Architect: Joseph Allen Stein

Renovating team
- Architects: Praveen Vashisht & Associates
- Renovating firm: Xebec Project Management Services www.xebecdesign.com
- Services engineer: Spectral Services Consultants

Website
- www.expresstowers.in
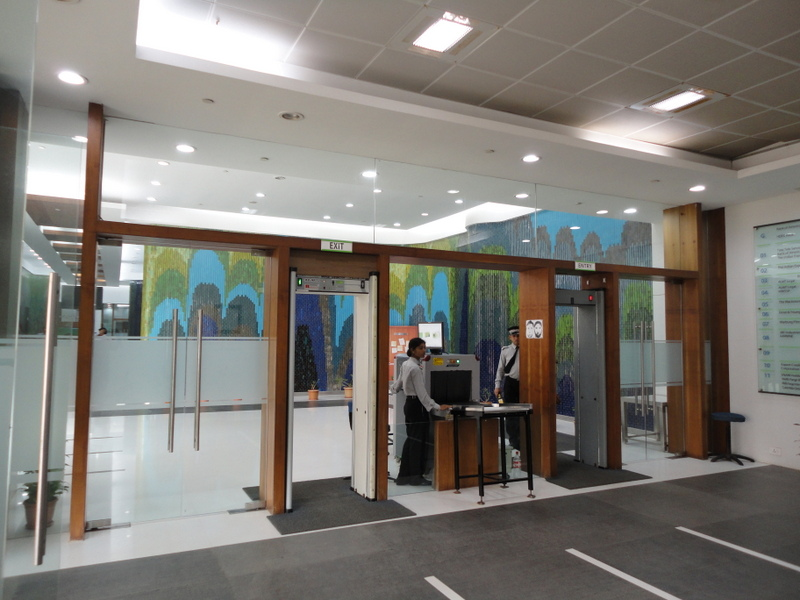
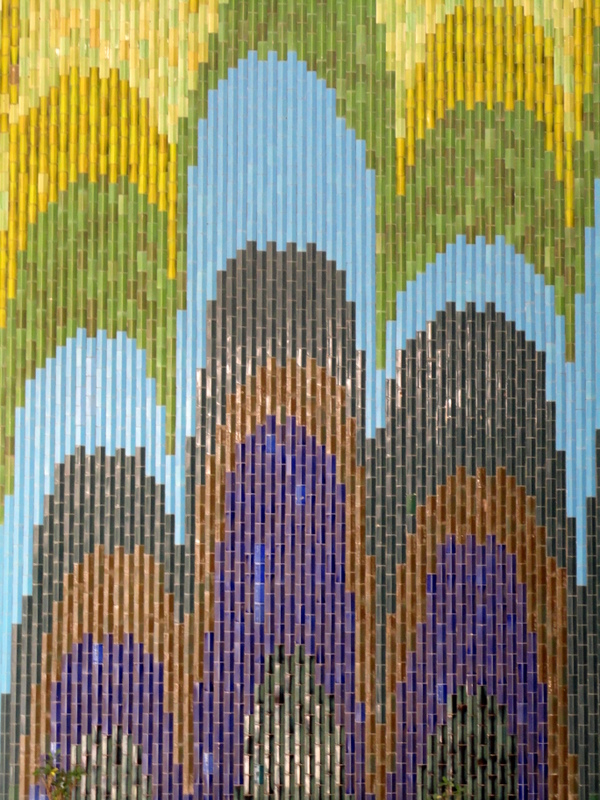
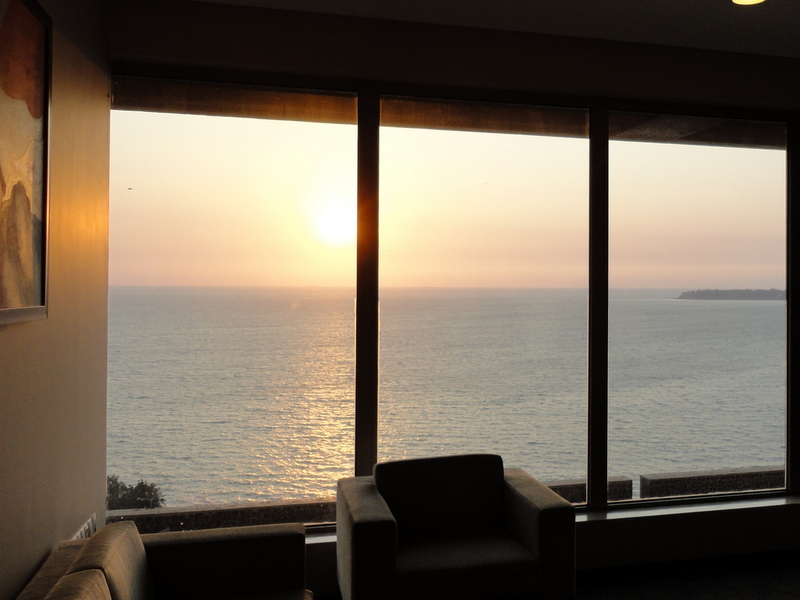
- Renovated Lobby Nelly Sethna Mural at Express Towers, Closeup View from Express Towers-3

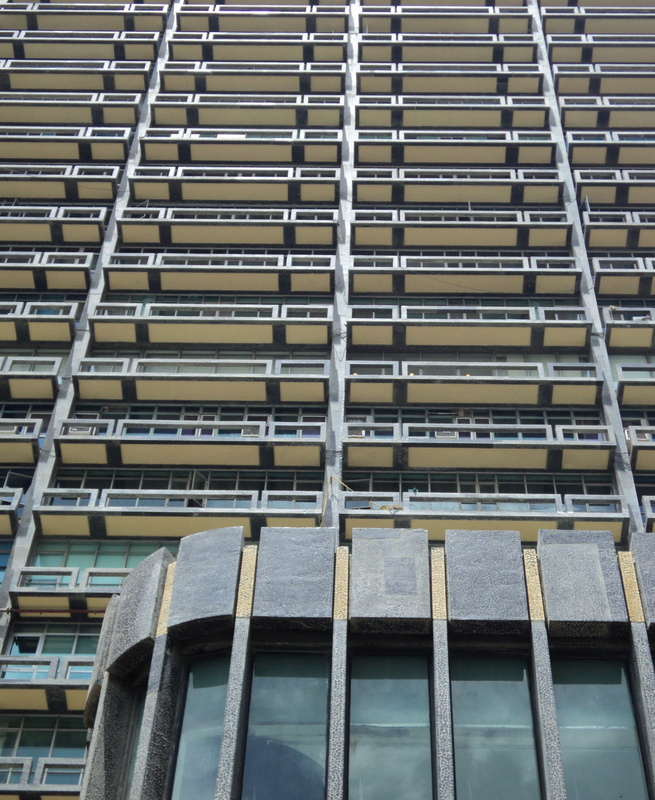
Renovated Facade, Express Towers

The Express Towers is a 25-storey building located on Marine Drive in Nariman Point, Mumbai, India. Upon its completion in 1972, the 105 metres (344 ft) building was the tallest building in South Asia for about two years. The building serves as the corporate headquarters of Indian Express Limited, On 19 November 2013, Blackstone Group along with Pune-based Panchshil Realty reached a deal to buy the iconic South Mumbai building for Rupees 900 crore (US$144 million).

== History ==
The building was commissioned by Ramnath Goenka, founder of Indian Express Limited, who was determined to build the tallest building in South Asia. It was the first major building to be built in the reclaimed land of Nariman Point.

The building was designed by Joseph Allen Stein, an American architect who chose to settle in India. A Padma Shri awardee, he was well known for his elegant, simple and ecologically gentle architecture and his buildings today are recognized as landmarks worthy of preservation.

The Express Towers is the only high-rise Stein ever designed. The building is unique for the way it connects to the ground. The tower block rises from a terrace garden above a three floor high podium. Even in mid 1960s, Stein recognized the increasing use of cars, particularly for commercial buildings. Thus, a full floor at street level was dedicated to parking. Visitors on foot were brought into the building via a gentle ramp on the floor above and allowed to pass through the building via another ramp on the other side. The lift and stairs core in the centre of the tower block allowed openings on all four sides. Cantilevered balconies at lintel level protect the full height windows from sun and rain, while occupants can view the Arabian Sea on one side and the city and the harbour on the other.

At the time of its completion, the Express Towers was the tallest building in South Asia, a position it held for about two years. It surpassed the 101 metres (331 ft) Habib Bank Plaza in Karachi, Pakistan. In turn, it was surpassed in 1973 by the Oberoi Trident Towers which measured 117 metres (384 ft).

The building occupies a prime location in Mumbai on Marine Drive, facing the Arabian Sea. As of 2011, the building's better known tenants include McKinsey & Company, Blackstone Group, Ernst & Young, Mullen Lowe Lintas, ECGC, Wells Fargo Bank, IHCL and Warburg Pincus besides the Indian Express Limited.

The walls of the main lobby on ground floor feature murals in ceramic by Nelly Sethna (1932-1992), also a Padma Shri awardee, well known for her role in revival of Kalamkari by infusing a new set of aesthetics and designs to keep a rich and ancient tradition thriving. She was an alumnus of the Cranbrook Academy of Art, Michigan, USA, the same institution where, Joseph Stein, completed his degree in architecture.

As of 2013, the building has undergone extensive renovations, while remaining occupied. The works involved complete replacement of the electrical systems, new central air-conditioning, plumbing systems, fire fighting systems, state of the art IBMS and security system, interior for common lobbies, external landscaping, waterproofing and restoration of the roof garden on the podium, and gensets for power back were also added. Complete external structural rehabilitation was done without the use of a scaffolding system and the external facade was restored.

The most challenging aspect of the renovation project was that it was done even as the building remained fully occupied. Works were done through nights and weekends and during the daytime the building functioned normally.

The building was purchased by Blackstone Group in partnership with Pune-based Panchshil Realty on 19 November 2013. Under the terms of the purchase, the penthouse at the top of the iconic building belonging to Indian Express MD and CEO Vivek Goenka, the restaurants belonging to the Indian Express Group and their offices will not be sold to the American Private Equity giant.

== The Elite Neighbourhood Film ==
Express Towers has produced a film, The Elite Neighbourhood, on the iconic building's repositioning journey to modernize its facilities while retaining the vision of Joseph Allen Stein, the world-renowned architect of Express Towers.

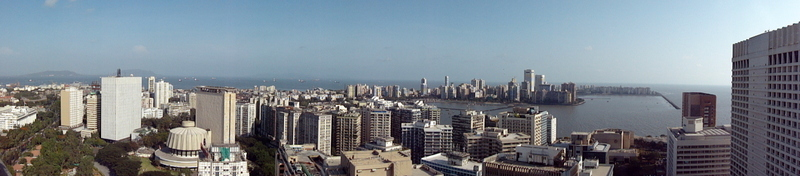
from Express Towers-1

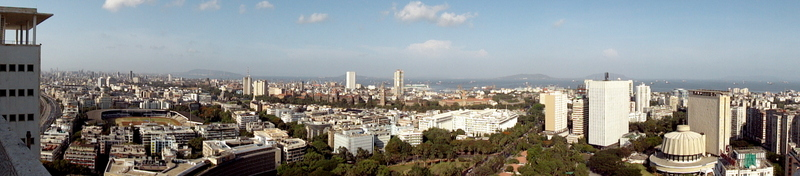
from Express Towers-2
