= Benjamin Polk =

American architect

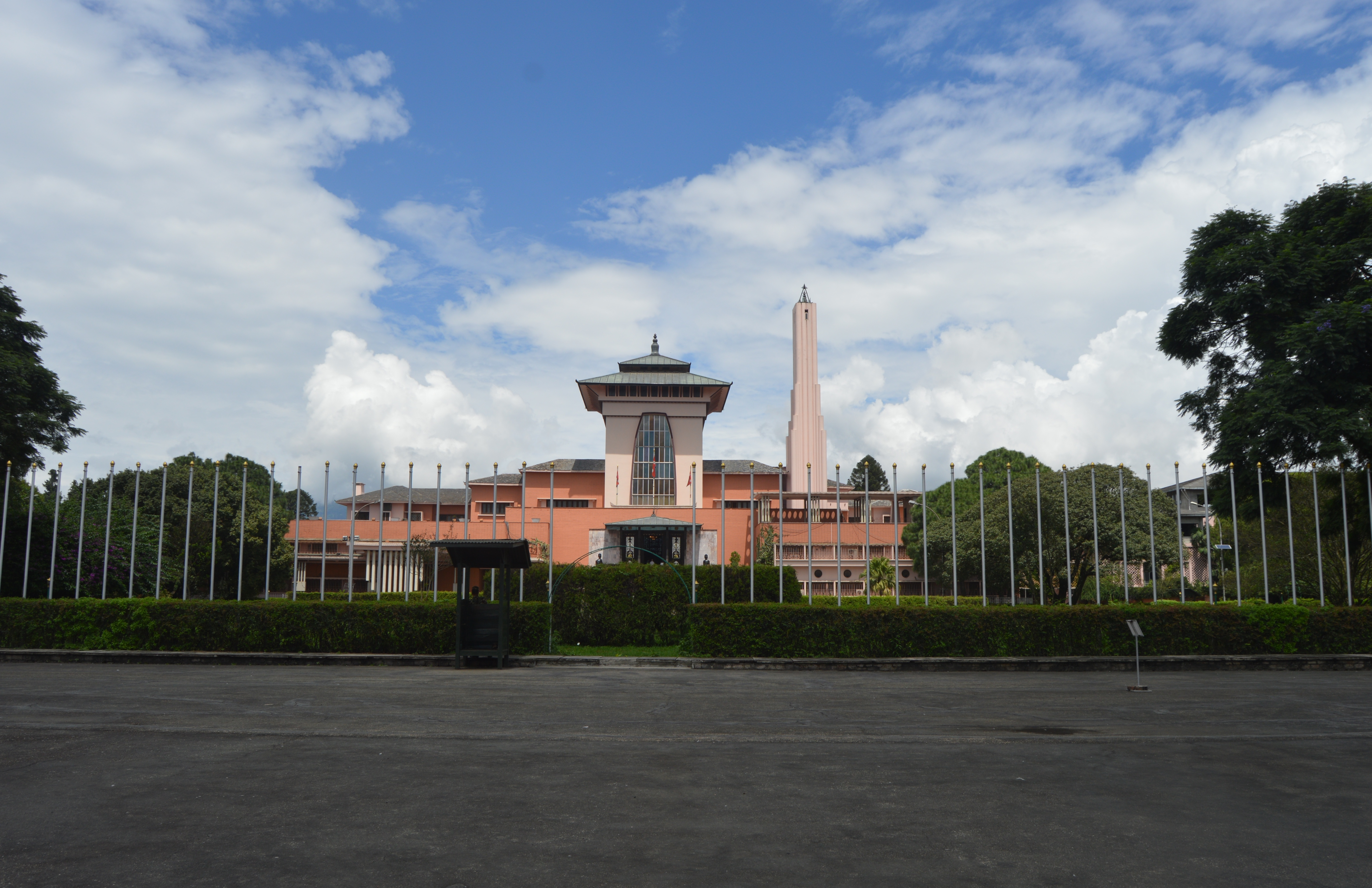
Narayanhity Palace Museum (formerly Narayanhity Royal Palace) in Kathmandu, Nepal

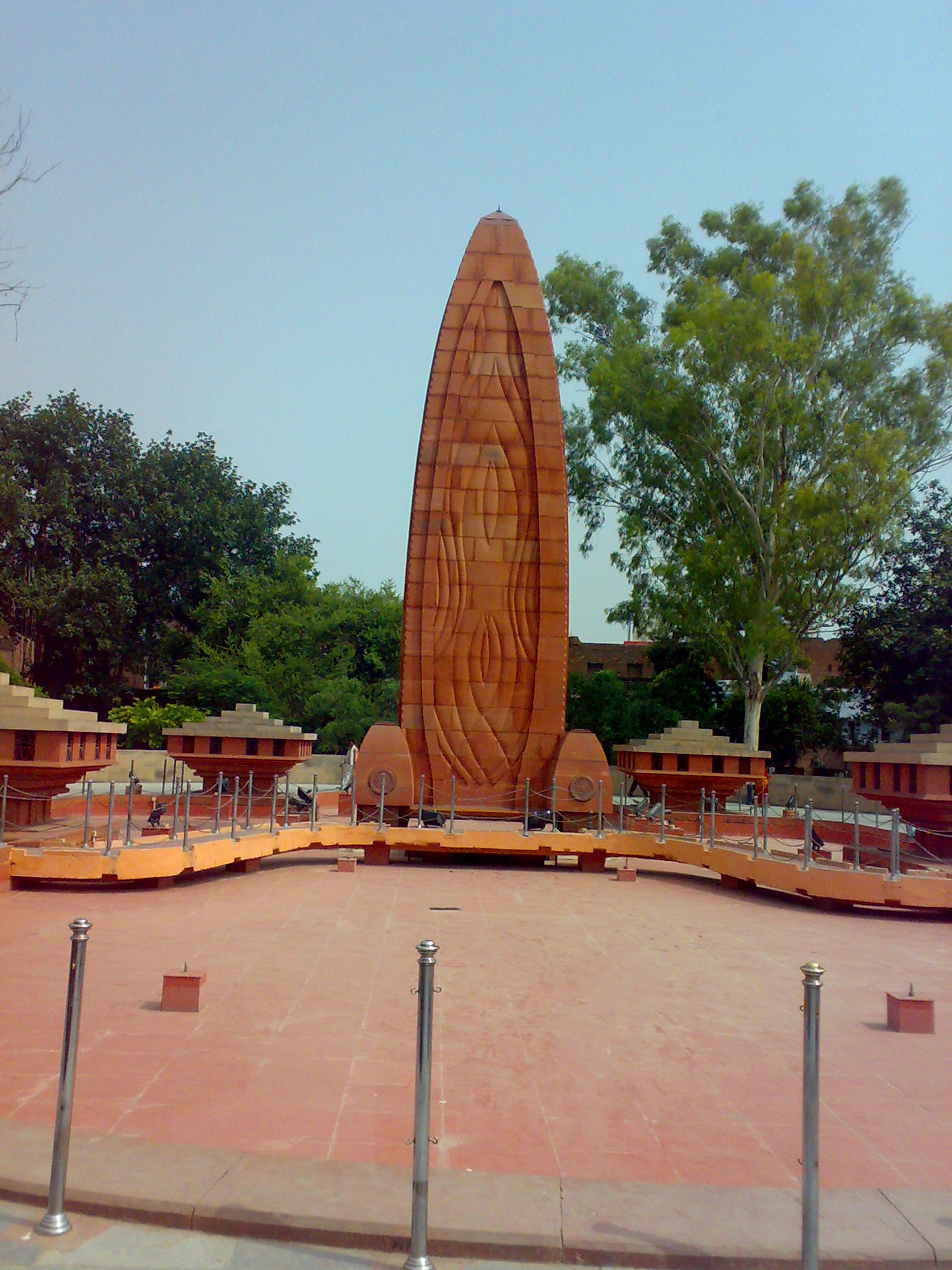
Jallianwala Bagh memorial, Amritsar

Benjamin Kauffman Polk (18 May 1916 – 23 April 2001) was an American designer and architect, best known for his work in India and Nepal.

Polk was raised by his parents, Harry Herndon Polk (30 November 1875 – 28 August 1949) and Alice Kauffman (12 August 1878 – 30 July 1973) in Des Moines, Polk County, Iowa. He practiced architecture in San Francisco from 1948 to 1952, where he met his future wife and companion, Emily Despain (née Isaacs). The couple moved to India in 1952, where they would remain until September 1963.

Polk designed both in the public and private sector. In 1955 he formed an association with another expatriate American architect, Joseph Allen Stein, later adding civil engineer Binoy K. Chatterjee, to form the firm of Stein, Chatterjee and Polk. Polk and Chatterjee left the firm in 1961, moving their new office to Calcutta named Chatterjee and Polk. Notable among his work include the Times of India main building, Buddhist Tripitaka Library in Rangoon, the Royal Palace for His Majesty the King of Nepal, Kathmandu, and the beautiful Jallianwala Bagh Memorial in Amritsar. In all these projects he was assisted by Indian architect Suraj P Subherwal. Suraj P. Subherwal, later, won a National Architectural Competition to become Architect of XXXVIII International Eucharistic Congress held at Bombay in December 1964 and attended by Pope Paul VI.

Polk returned to the United States in 1968, where he took up teaching architecture at the California Polytechnic University in San Luis Obispo, California. He was the author of several books, primarily concerning architecture, and most notably "Buddhist Monastic Architecture in Sri Lanka" and "The India Notebook," which he wrote with his wife. He died due to natural causes in 2001.
