= Kharadi =

- Suburb
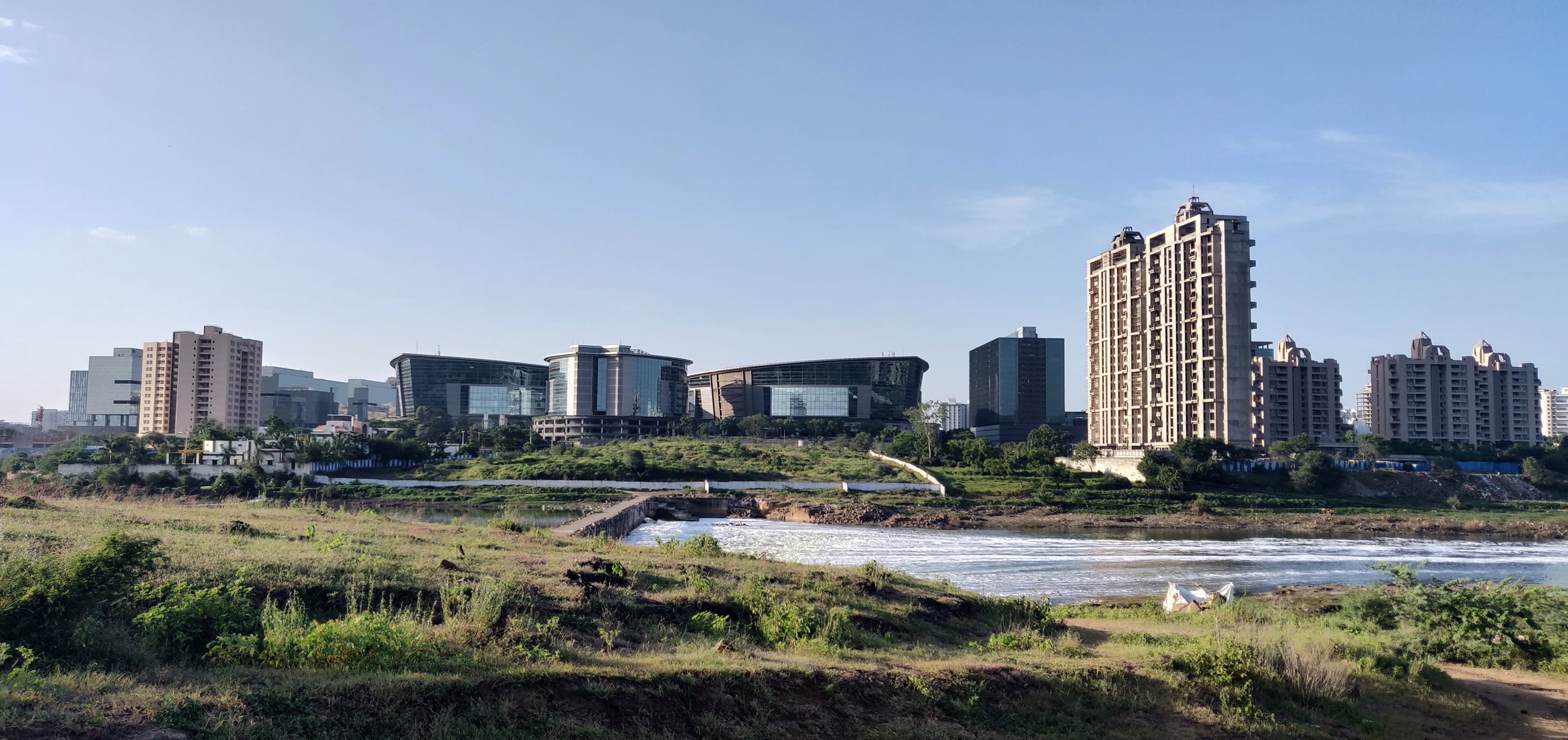
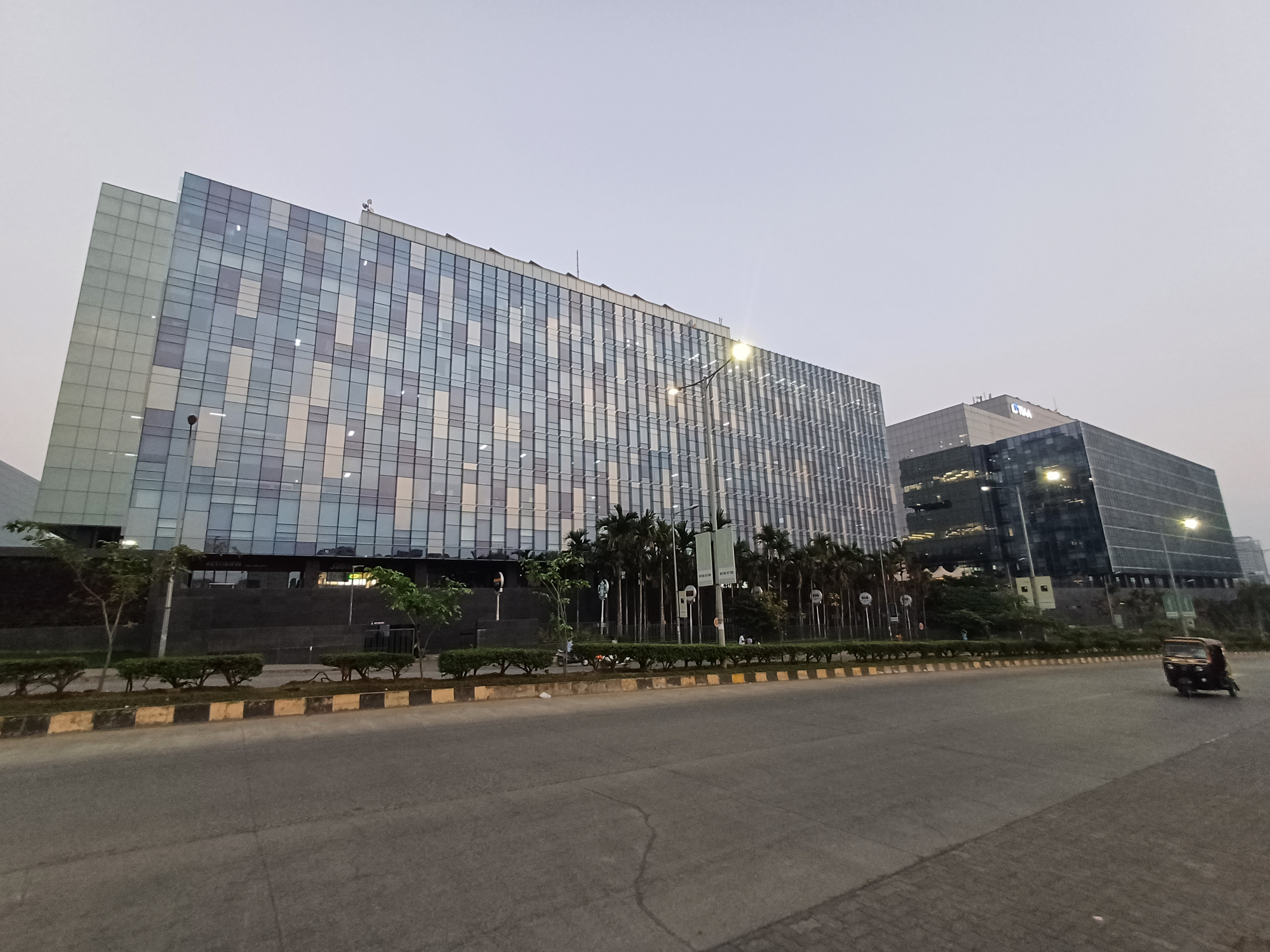
- View of EON Free Zone, World Trade Center

- Location in Maharashtra, India
- Coordinates: 18°33′08″N 73°56′37″E
- Country: India
- State: Maharashtra
- District: Pune

Government
  - Body: Pune Municipal Corporation

Languages
  - Official: Marathi
- Time zone: UTC+5:30 (IST)
- PIN: 411 014
- Vehicle registration: MH-12
- Lok Sabha Constituency: Pune
- Civic agency: Pune Municipal Corporation

Kharadi is a suburb located in the Eastern Metropolitan Corridor of Pune, India, on the banks of the Mula-Mutha river that serves as a hub for information technology and business parks. It is rapidly developing in terms of residential and office projects.

== History ==
Originally a village, the IT boom, beginning in roughly 2005, established major Multinational corporations in the area. Residential projects followed, and development is moving at a rapid pace in the 2020s. The exponential development of Kharadi in the 2010s has caused demands for a metro station in the area. The possibility of a line connection has been touted by offices and companies, some even willing to contribute funds to the project - similar to IT companies in Bangalore.

== Geography ==
=== Location ===
Kharadi is located in the north-east of Pune. It is approximately 15 minutes from the Pune Airport by car. To its north is Lohegaon; to the south is the Mula-Mutha River and the neighbourhoods of Magarpatta and Hadapsar; to its west is Chandan Nagar, Wadgaonsheri, and Viman Nagar; and to its east is the neighbourhood of Wagholi. The rain brings in comfort for people. Average temperature between June and first set of September ranges between 25 and 20 degree Celsius and during winters it ranges between 10 degree Celsius and 25 degree Celsius

=== Climate ===
Kharadi has a hot, semi-arid climate. It is between a tropical wet and dry. The area experiences three seasons: summer, monsoon, and winter. The summers are hot, dry, and clear lasting for 2.5 months. The monsoons are windy, cold, and overcast. The winters last for roughly 2 months, the coldest month of the year being January.

== Economy ==
Kharadi is one of Pune's IT hubs. Companies that have offices in Kharadi include Vodafone, Barclays, TATA, Credit Suisse, UBS, Symantec, Citigroup, Seagate Technology, Mphasis, Veritas Technologies, Zensar, Allianz, Northern Trust, and UBS. Pune's only World Trade Centre is located in the area. The campus has several buildings and is one of India's 25 WTCs. It is a member of the World Trade Centers Association.

Kharadi was the home of US - based MNC Urban Air Mobility (UAM) Blade (company) vertiport offering daily helicopter service to Mumbai. The travel time from Kharadi to Mumbai was cut down to 35 minutes due to the service. The vertiport was soon relocated to Koregaon Park - a posh, affluent, central Pune neighbourhood.

== Culture ==
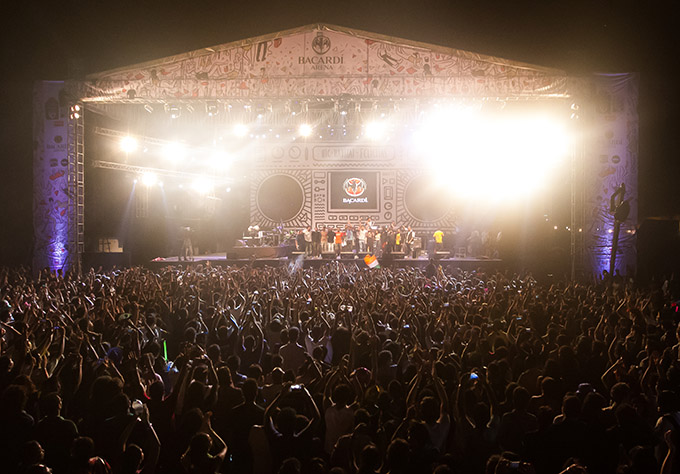
NH7 Weekender

Kharadi has been the venue for multiple music festivals in the past. The VH1 Supersonic music festival took place in Kharadi, featuring artists such as Diplo, Marshmello, Machine Gun Kelly and more. Moreover, the popular festival all over India NH7 Weekender chooses Kharadi as its home when the circus makes its way to Pune.

== Medical ==
Multispeciality Hospital in Kharadi Pune

== See also ==
- Hinjawadi
- Magarpatta
- Vimannagar
- Koregaon Park
- Kalyani Nagar
