= Trident Hotel, Nariman Point =

Building in India

Trident Hotel
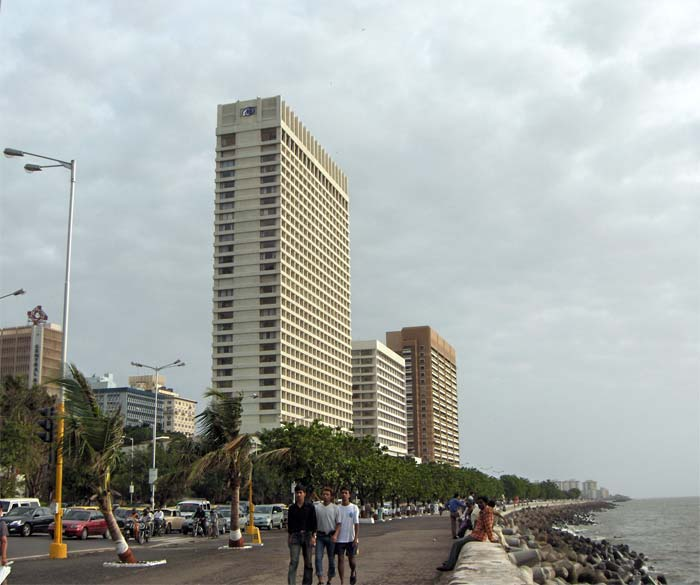
- Trident hotel in 2005
- Interactive map of the Trident Hotel area

General information
- Location: Marine drive road, Nariman point, South Mumbai, Maharashtra, Marine Drive, Nariman Point, Mumbai (South), Mumbai district, Maharashtra, India, PIN - 400021, Mumbai, India
- Coordinates: 18.9270°N 72.8204°E
- Opened: 7 April 1973
- Owner: East India Hotels

Height
- Height: 117 metres (384 ft)

Technical details
- Material: Concrete
- Floor count: 35

Design and construction
- Architecture firm: P.G. Patki Associates
- Main contractor: Shapoorji Pallonji & Co Limited

Website
- www.tridenthotels.com

The Trident Nariman Point is a luxury hotel on Marine Drive in Nariman Point, Mumbai, India. It is owned and operated by the Trident Hotels division of The Oberoi Group.

It has 35 floors, on completion in 1973, it was the tallest building in South Asia, surpassing the 105 metres (344 ft) Express Towers, located next door. It stayed the tallest building in South Asia until 1980, when Phiroze Jeejeebhoy Towers were completed in downtown Mumbai .

== History ==
The hotel opened on 7 April 1973 as the Oberoi-Sheraton Hotel. It was built by Mohan Singh Oberoi, at a cost of 180 million rupees, as a joint venture between his Oberoi Hotels and US-based Sheraton Hotels, which had an equity interest of $500,000. Oberoi paid Sheraton a fee of $150 per room per year to manage the hotel, but this gave him access to an international reservations and marketing system, and also allowed him to qualify for a 43.5 million rupee loan from the United States Agency for International Development. The loan was contingent on Oberoi accepting four American directors on his board. As the Americans could not be present at meetings, they were represented by local stand-ins. The hotel showed a profit of 450,000 rupees in 1974, and by 1978 annual profits were 29.4 million rupees.

In 1978, Sheraton signed a marketing agreement with ITC to represent the properties of their WelcomHotels division, located across India. Oberoi angrily called it a "breach of an agreement both in letter and in spirit". In addition, Sheraton demanded that the annual fee Oberoi paid be doubled to $300 per room per year, and that the new 200-room wing of the hotel that was then under construction (today known as The Oberoi Mumbai) be covered at the same higher rate. Oberoi severed the joint venture with Sheraton and the hotel was renamed The Oberoi Towers on 5 March 1979. The hotel was renamed Hilton Towers Mumbai on 5 April 2004, as part of a marketing alliance between Oberoi and Hilton Hotels. It was renamed Trident Nariman Point on 1 April 2008, when the alliance with Hilton ended. It was also iconic for being a victim of the 2008 Mumbai attacks in November of 2008.
