= Nariman Point =

- Urban
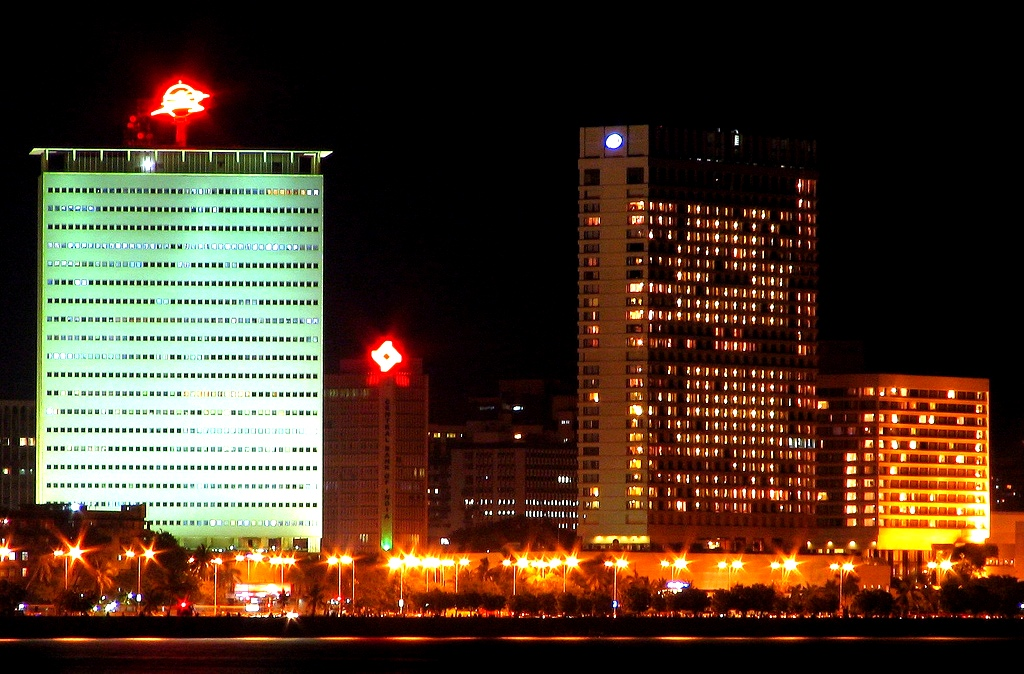
- Air India Building, Trident hotel and Oberoi hotel (L-R) on Marine Drive in Nariman point

- Nariman point in Mumbai Nariman Point (Maharashtra)
- Country: India
- State: Maharashtra
- District: Mumbai City
- City: Mumbai
- Founder: Khurshed Nariman
- Named for: Khurshed Nariman

Government
  - Type: Municipal Corporation
  - Body: Brihanmumbai Municipal Corporation (BMC)

Languages
  - Official: Marathi
- Time zone: UTC+5:30 (IST)
- PIN: 400021
- Area code: 022
- Vehicle registration: MH 01
- Civic agency: BMC

Nariman Point is a prominent downtown area of Mumbai in Maharashtra, India. Located on the southern tip of the Mumbai peninsula, at the end of the Mumbai's Marine Drive, Nariman Point houses some of India's prestigious business headquarters. Because of this, it is seen as the business district of Mumbai.

It is bordered by Churchgate in North, Arabian Sea on West and South, by Colaba on East side. It is one of the tourist attractions of Mumbai due to its skyline, Arabian sea view, Marine drive and lots of luxury 5 star hotels, restaurants.

== Economy ==
Notable Headquarters and Offices

For many years, Air India operated from the Air India Building, one of the district's most recognizable landmarks, symbolizing the prominence of the national airline. Renewable energy companies, including Ind Renewable Energy Ltd and Vakharia Power Infrastructure Ltd, are headquartered in Regent Chambers, a prominent commercial building at 208 Nariman Point, housing various energy and infrastructure firms.

== History ==
In 2006, prior to the 2008 financial crisis, Nariman point was the seventh most expensive location in the world for office space. However, by December 2012 Nariman Point had fallen to 25th place while Delhi's Connaught Place remained the fifth most expensive location despite many offices moving to Gurgaon and Noida. During the same period, Nariman Point also dropped from seventh to fifteenth most expensive location for office rentals. The reasons for the decline were the high prices, lower quality and age of construction, and increasing distances from residential hubs which have now moved northwards and to the suburbs. In the first three quarters of 2012, Nariman Point had a vacancy rate of almost 25%, compared with 18% in the rest of the Mumbai city.

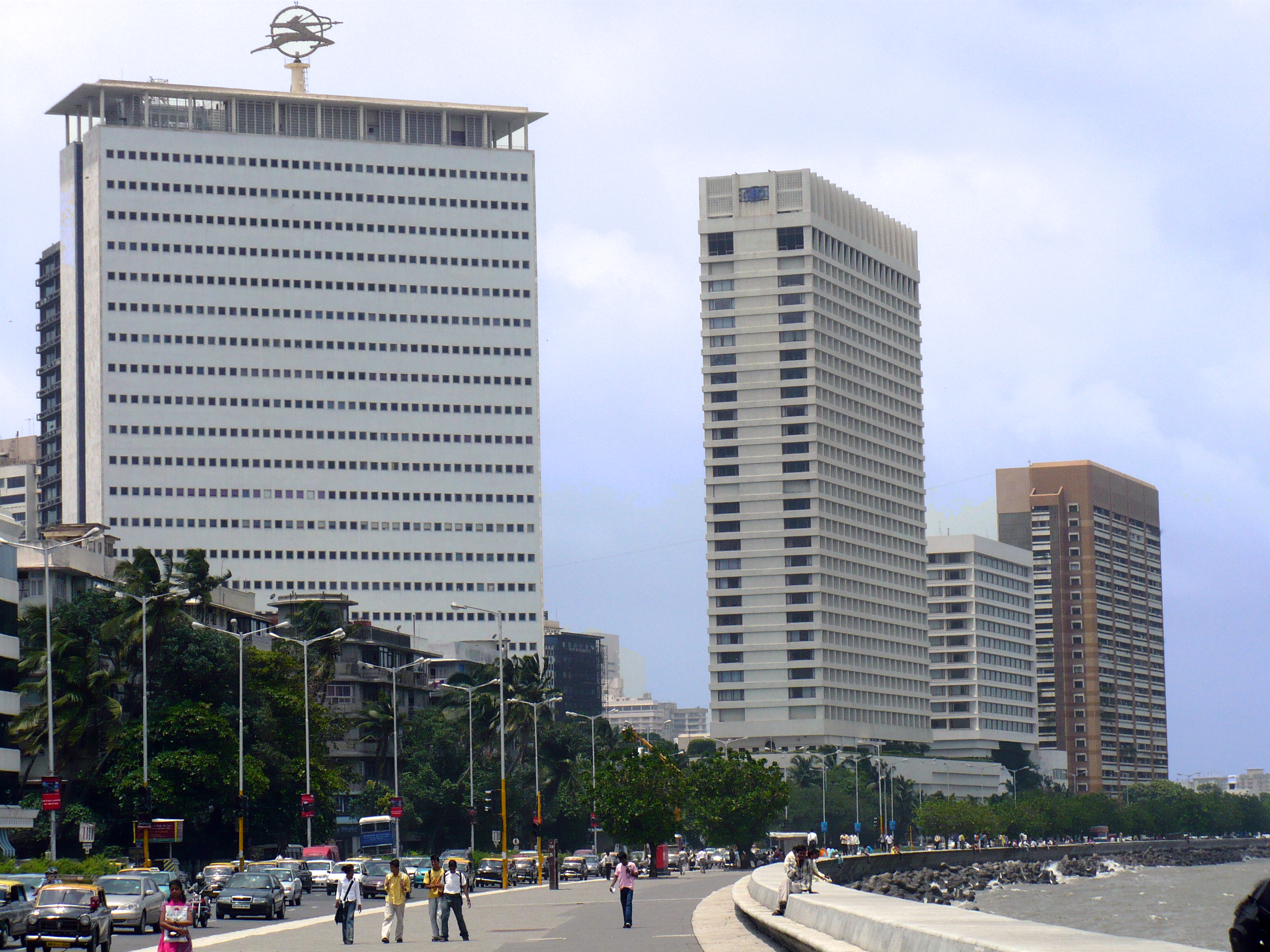
From left to right, Air India building, Trident hotel, Oberoi hotel and Marine drive road in the Nariman Point

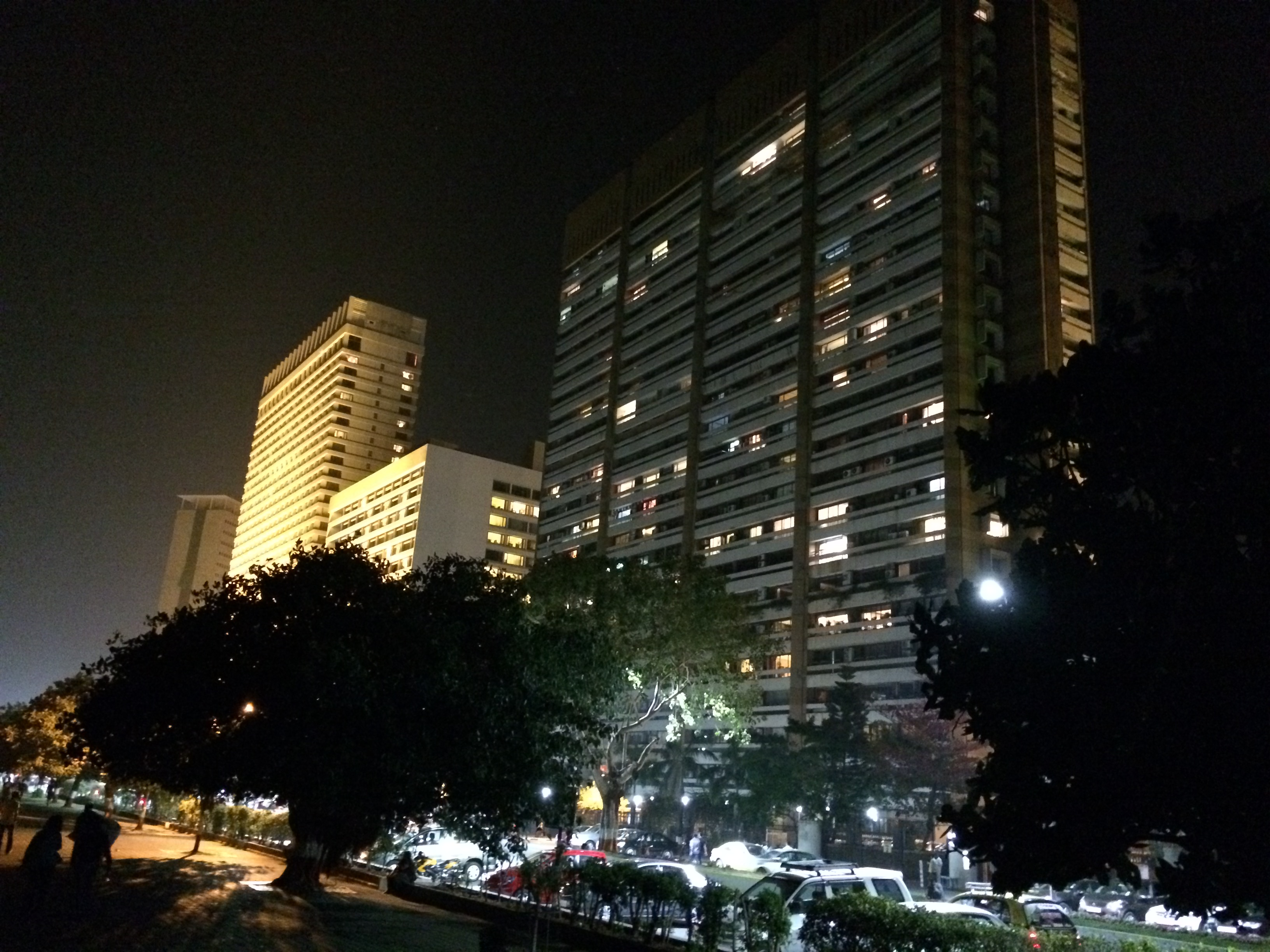
Nariman point buildings at night

=== Terrorist attacks ===
In 1993, the 1993 Bombay bombings took place. Bombs were destroyed at Nariman Point and nearby places. There were also bombs in other parts of the city.

On the evening of 26 November 2008, Pakistani-trained Lashkar-e-Taiba terrorists attacked the luxury hotels Trident and Oberoi, which are located in this area. They used AK-47 assault rifles and Hand Grenades in their attack, which was part of the larger Mumbai terrorist attack. 166 people were killed, 238 injured to various degrees, and the Taj Hotel was besieged for 3 days. The Mumbai police apprehended one of the terrorists, Ajmal Kasab. The rest were eliminated in various operations by India's security forces.

== Gallery ==
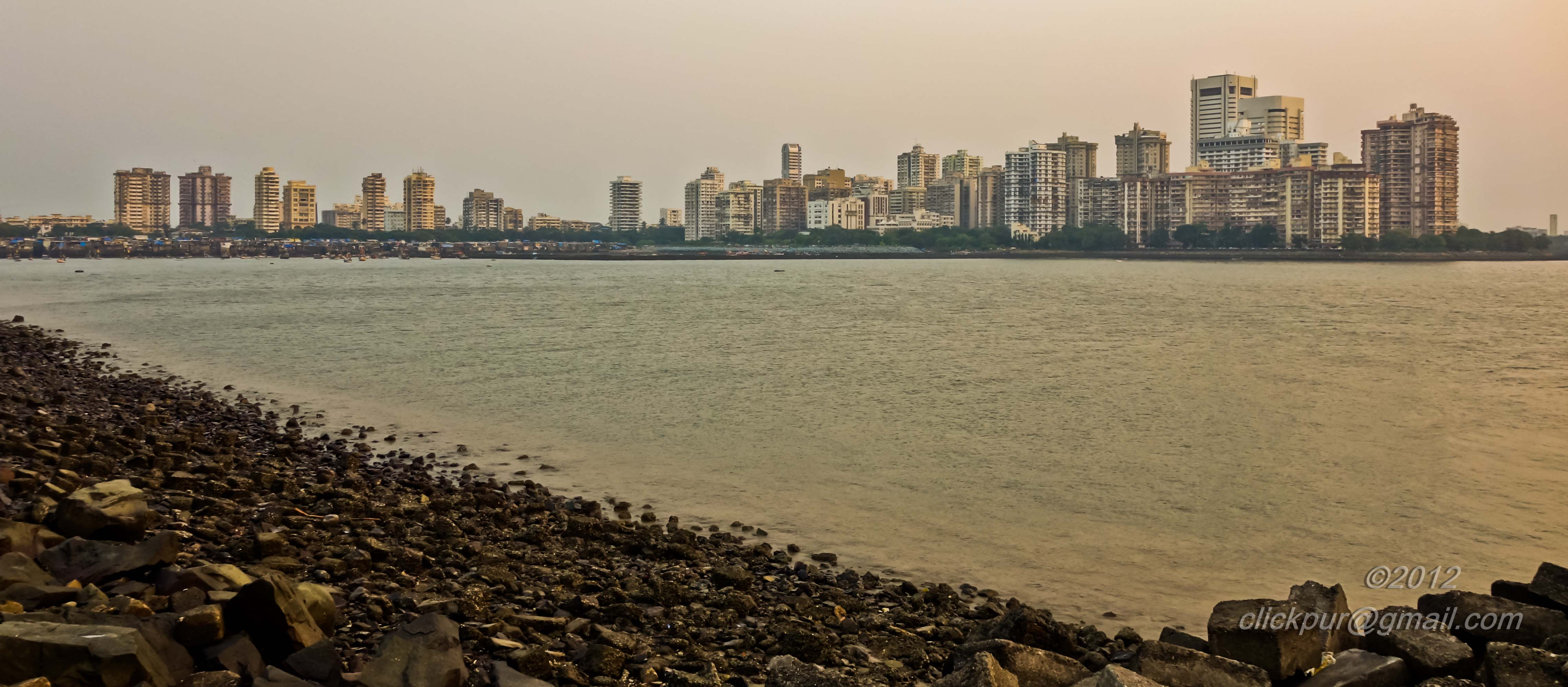
A view of Nariman Point and Colaba in day light

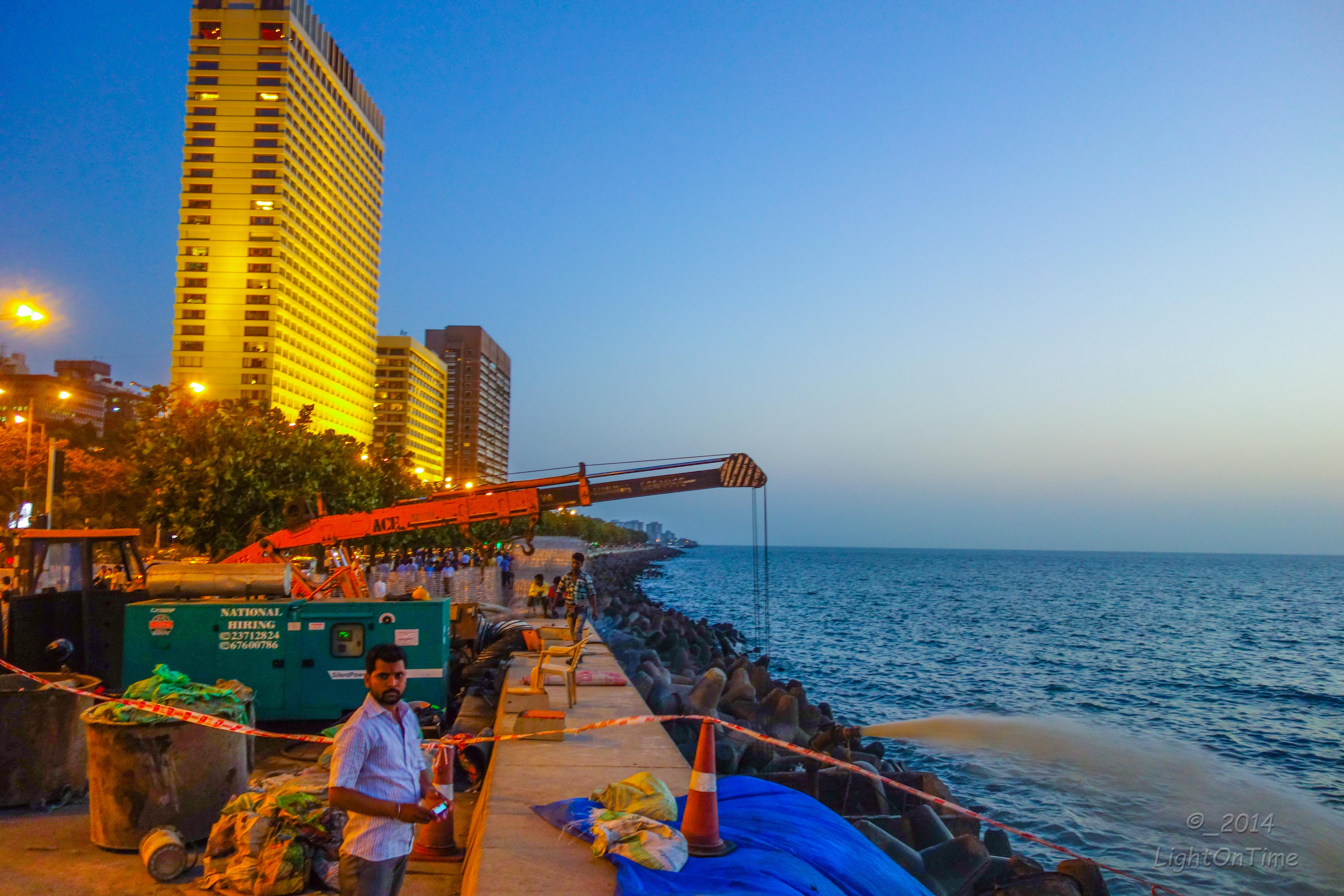
View of Nariman Point in the evening

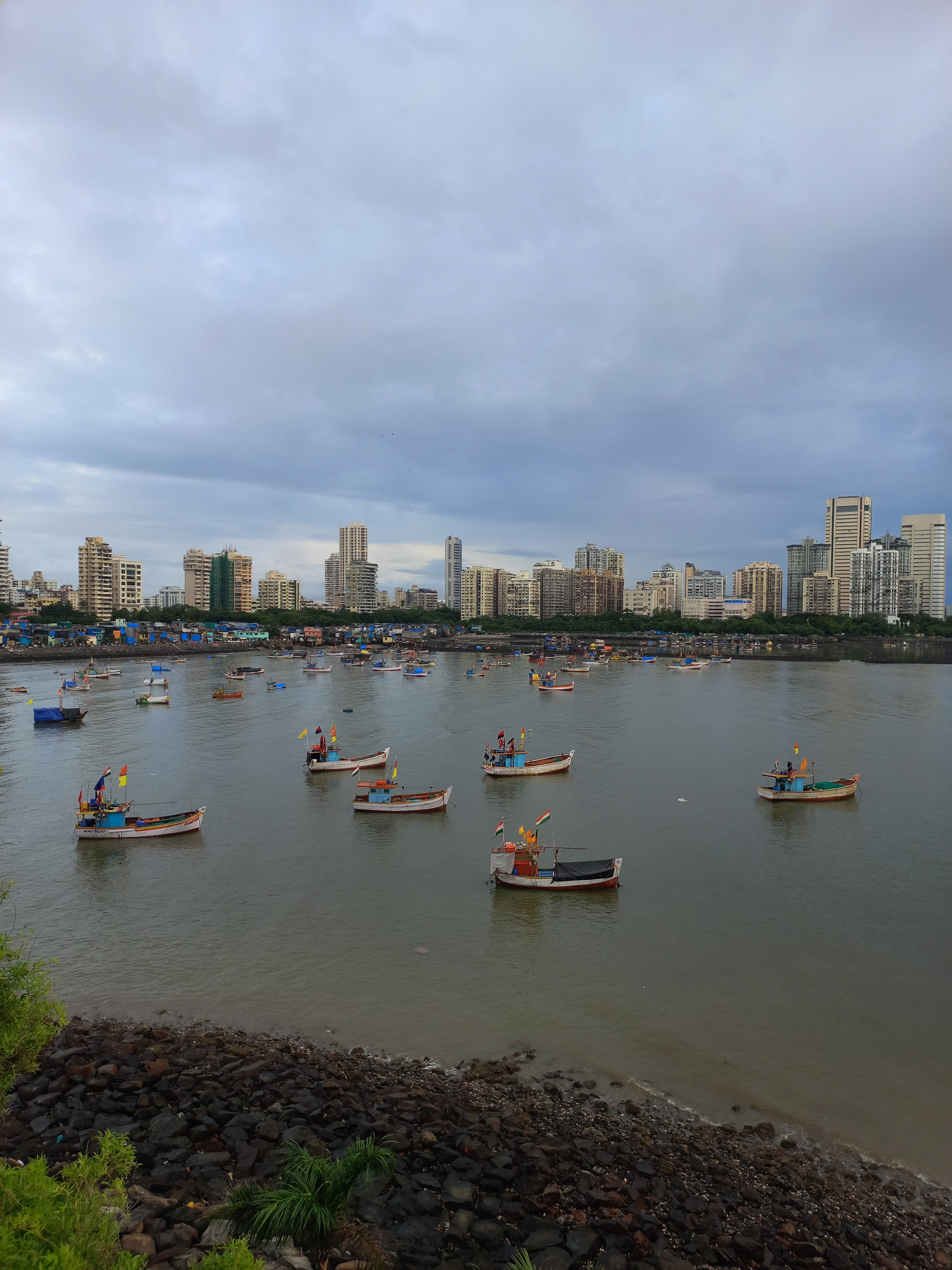
View of Colaba and Cuffe Parade from Nariman Point
