= Neeraj =

- Gender: Male
- Language: Sanskrit; Bengali; Hindi; Malayalam; Marathi; Gujarati; Nepali; Telugu; Punjabi; Dogri; Maithili

Origin
- Origin: Sanskrit
- Meaning: Lotus flower
- Region of origin: Indian subcontinent

Other names
- Alternative spelling: Niraj

Neeraj (Devanagari: नीरज) is an Indian masculine given name common in the Indian subcontinent. The meaning of Neeraj is "lotus flower" in the Sanskrit language. Neeraj is a name of Sanskrit origin and it is a very common name for Hindu men.

Notable people with the name include:

- Neeraj Kumar Singh Bablu (born 1969), Indian politician based in Bihar
- Neeraj Basoya (born 1976), Indian politician
- Neeraj Bist (born 1990), Indian cricketer
- Neeraj Bora (born 1967), Indian politician
- Neeraj Chaturvedi (born 1952), Indian politician
- Neeraj Chawla (born 1979), Indian cricketer
- Neeraj Chopra (born 1997), Indian javelin thrower
- Neeraj Choudhary, Indian Mountaineer and polar explorer
- Neeraj Dangi (born 1970), Indian politician
- Neeraj George (born 1987), Indian mountaineer and para badminton player
- Neeraj Ghaywan (born 1980), Indian director
- Neeraj Goyat (born 1991), Indian professional boxer
- Neeraj Gupta (born 1969), Indian sculptor
- Neeraj Kabi (born 1968), Indian actor and theatre director
- Neeraj Kanwar (born 1971), Indian businessman
- Neeraj Kayal, Indian computer scientist and mathematician
- Neeraj Khemlani, Co-president of CBS News
- Neeraj Kumar (filmmaker), American actor
- Neeraj Kumar (police officer) (born 1953), Ex-Commissioner of Police, Delhi
- Neeraj Singh Lodhi, Indian politician
- Neeraj Madhav (born 1990), Indian actor, rapper and dancer
- Neeraj Kushwaha Maurya (born 1969), Indian politician
- Neeraj Mittal (born 1967), Secretary of Ministry of Petroleum and Natural Gas of India
- Neeraj Nayar, Indian politician
- Neeraj (rower) (born 1999), Indian rower
- Neeraj Pandey (born 1973), Indian film director
- Neeraj Pandey (writer) (born 1989), Indian writer
- Neeraj Patil (born 1968), British politician
- Neeraj Roy (born 1967), Indian businessman
- Neeraj Sharma (born 1972), Indian politician
- Neeraj Shekhar (born 1968), Indian politician
- Neeraj Shridhar (born 1978), Indian film composer and singer-songwriter
- Neeraj Kumar Singh (died 2014), Indian Army Ashoka Chakra recipient
- Neeraj Sood (born 1969), Indian actor
- Neeraj Sood (officer) (1970–2010), Indian Army colonel
- Neeraj Suri, American computer scientist
- Neeraj Udhwani, Indian screenwriter
- Neeraj Vora (1963–2017), Indian film director
- Neeraj Yadav (politician) (1970–2023), Indian politician
- Neeraj Yadav (parathlete) (1984–2026), Indian Paralympian track and field athlete
- Neeraj Zimba (born 1981), Indian politician

Niraj

- Niraj Antani (born 1991), American politician
- Niraj Chag (born 1976), British musician
- Niraj Gera, Indian photographer and social activist
- Niraj Jain (1926–2013), Indian Jainism scholar, poet, and archaeologist
- Niraj Odedra (born 1975), Indian cricketer and coach
- Niraj Patel (born 1981), Indian cricketer
- Niraj Shah (born 1973/74), American businessman
