= Gera (surname) =

Gera is a surname.

== Notable people ==
Notable people with the surname include:

=== Hungarian people ===
- Bernice Gera (1931–1992), American baseball umpire
- Clemente Gera (died 1643), Italian Catholic prelate
- Csaba Gera (born 1977), Hungarian judoka
- Dániel Gera (born 1995), Hungarian footballer
- Elida Gera (1932–2017), Israeli director, dancer and choreographer
- Imre Géra (1947–2026), Hungarian cyclist
- József Gera (1896–1946), Hungarian politician and doctor
- Manuel Gera (born 1963), German church musician and organist
- Marina Gera (born 1984), Hungarian actress
- Ralucca Gera, American mathematician
- Steve Gera (born 1978), American sports executive and coach
- Zoltán Gera (1923–2014), Hungarian actor
- Zoltán Gera (born 1979), Hungarian footballer

=== Indian people ===
- Ankit Gera (born 1987), Indian actor
- Gaurav Gera (born 1973), Indian comedian and actor
- Karan Gera, Indian artist
- Niraj Gera, Indian photographer and social activist
- Rohena Gera (born 1973), Indian director, screenwriter, and producer
- Yash Gera (born 1986), Indian actor, model and DJ

== See also ==
- Pera (surname)
- Gera (disambiguation)
