= Neeraj Kumar =

Neeraj Kumar may refer to:

- Neeraj Kumar (filmmaker)
- Neeraj Kumar (police officer)

== See also ==
- Neeraj Kumar Singh, Indian Army soldier
- Neeraj Kumar Singh Bablu, Indian politician
