= Gera (disambiguation) =

Gera is a city in Thuringia, Germany.

Gera, Géra or GERA may also refer to:

== Places ==
=== Africa ===
- Gera (Egypt) (also Geras or Gerrha), former city and current Latin Catholic titular see
- Kingdom of Gera, a former realm in present-day Ethiopia
- Gera (woreda), district located in Ethiopia about the same place as the former kingdom

=== Europe ===
- Bezirk Gera former district of the German Democratic Republic centered on Gera
- Gera, former community on the Zahme Gera river, today Geraberg, Germany
- Gera (river), a river in Thuringia, Germany, and its sources and tributaries
  - Wilde Gera, left tributary
  - Wilde Gera (Erfurt), arm of the Gera at Erfurt, Germany
  - Zahme Gera, right tributary
- Gera, Greece, municipality on the island of Lesbos, Greece
- Gera (Pizzighettone) a locality in Lombardy, Italy
- Gera Lario, a town in Lombardy, Italy
- Sveta Gera, peak of the Žumberak hills in Croatia, named after St. Gertrude the Great

=== United States ===
- Gera, Virginia, an unincorporated community in Virginia

== People ==
- Gera (surname)
- Gera, name of several minor characters in the Bible

=== Fictional characters ===
- Dagan Gera, a character in the 2023 action-adventure video game Star Wars: Jedi Survivor

== Other uses ==
- GoldenEye: Rogue Agent, a James Bond spin-off video game
- Gera language, an Afro-Asiatic language of Nigeria
- The Global Entertainment Retail Association, a trade association for entertainment retailers in Europe

== See also ==
- Ghera (disambiguation)
- Gerra (disambiguation)
- Geras (disambiguation)
- Gerah, an ancient Hebrew unit of weight and currency
