= Neeraj (disambiguation) =

Neeraj is an Indian masculine given name.

Neeraj may also refer to:

- Neeraj, a name of the Hindu deity Shiva
- Neeraj, Sanskrit term for the nelumbo nucifera (sacred lotus)
- Neeraj (rower), Indian rower
- Neeraj Grover murder case, 2008 murder of an Indian television executive working for Synergy Adlabs

== See also ==
- Neerja, a 2016 Indian film by Ram Madhvani, about Pan Am Flight 73 flight attendant Neerja Bhanot
  - Neerja (soundtrack), its soundtrack by Vishal Khurana
- Neerja – Ek Nayi Pehchaan, an Indian romantic drama television series
