= Gerra =

Gerra may refer to:

- Gerra (Gambarogno), Ticino, Switzerland
- Gerra (Verzasca), Ticino, Switzerland
- Gerra (moth), a moth genus
- Gerrha or Gerra, ancient city in Arabia

== See also ==
- Girra, Babylonian and Akkadian god of fire
- Gera (disambiguation)
- Ghera (disambiguation)
