= India Habitat Centre =

- Bharat Paryavas Kendra
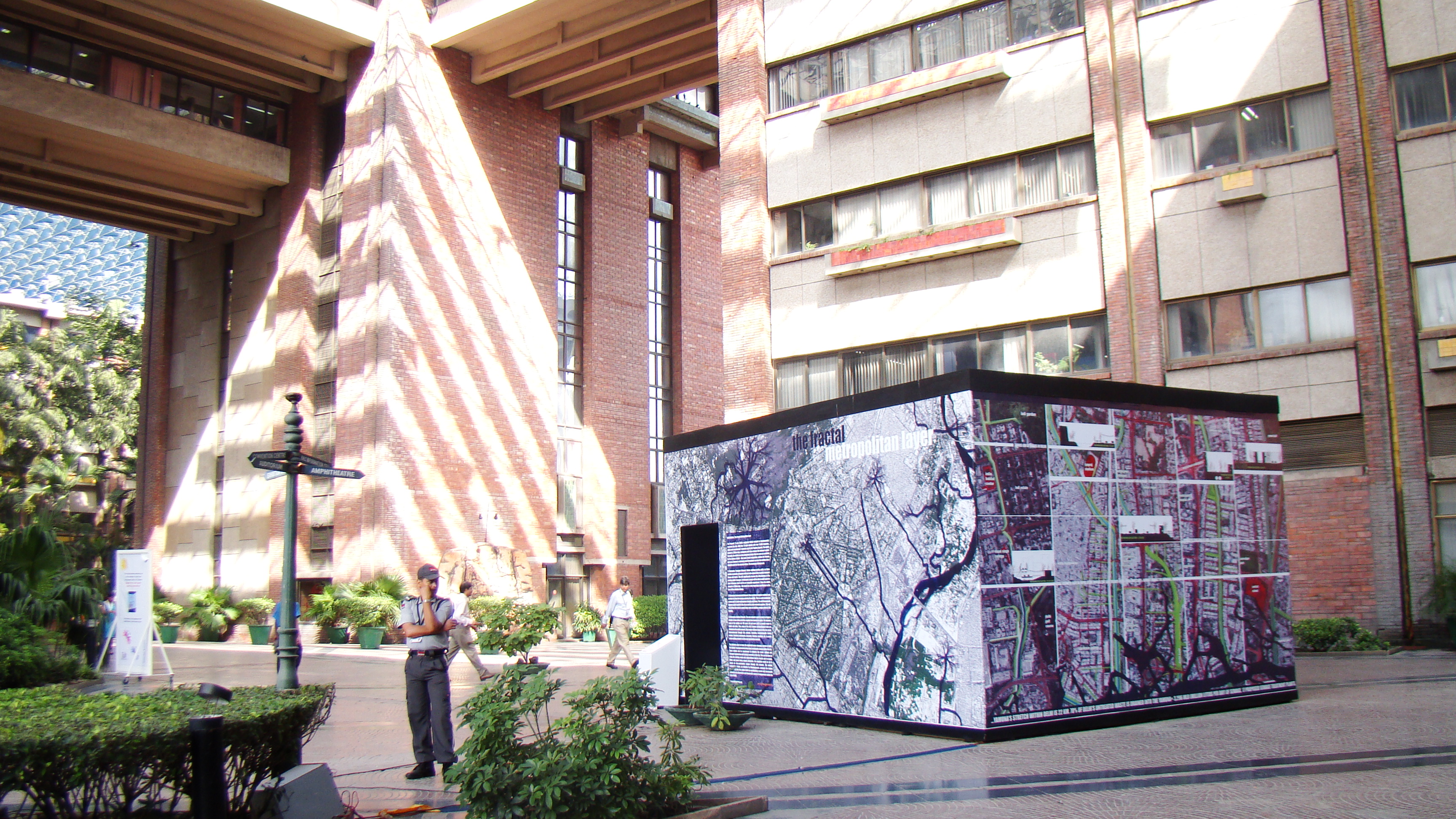
- Interactive map of the India Habitat Centre area

General information
- Location: Lodhi Road, New Delhi, India, India
- Coordinates: 28.5897°N 77.2249°E

Design and construction
- Architect: Joseph Allen Stein

Other information
- Parking: Available

The India Habitat Centre is a multipurpose building in the city of New Delhi, India. It was the brain child of the Housing and Urban Development Corporation (HUDCO) Chairman, Santosh Sharma. It includes the Stein Auditorium.

The India Habitat Centre is one of India's most comprehensive convention centers that is aimed at bringing individuals and institutions working in diverse habitat and environment related areas together.

Divided into five blocks which are connected with aerial walkaways, IHC can conduct up to 20 concurrent sessions from socio-cultural events and exhibitions to business and economic events. It has a Visual Art Gallery, Library and Resource Center, Learning Center, Amphitheater, Conference & Banquet Halls and Restaurants.

== History and design ==
The India Habitat Centre was started in 1993. The public agency for the Housing and Urban Development Corporation (HUDCO) wanted an office building for its workers and made the unprecedented decision to invite chosen nonprofit organizations that shared their concern with habitat to share that work space.

The chairman of HUDCO Santosh Sharma and the architect Joseph Allen Stein decided to radically change the traditional image of an office building as an architectural project and transformed it into an urban design project. The space was designed to permit the members of the centre to share services both inside and outside the building with multiple courtyards, common meeting rooms, shared parking area, library, restaurants, museum, and hotels, some of which are open to the general public. Constructed on nine acres in an urban area, the building eschewed traditional building materials and techniques.

== Events and exhibitions ==
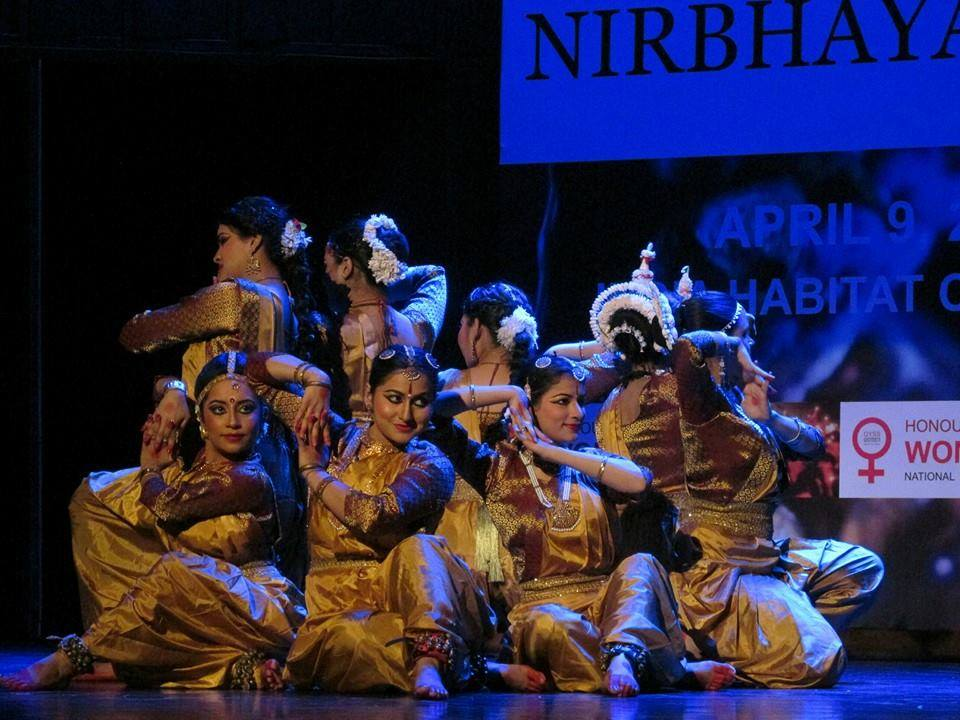
A group choreography at 2016 Nirbhaya Samaroh held on 9 April at India Habitat Centre, New Delhi

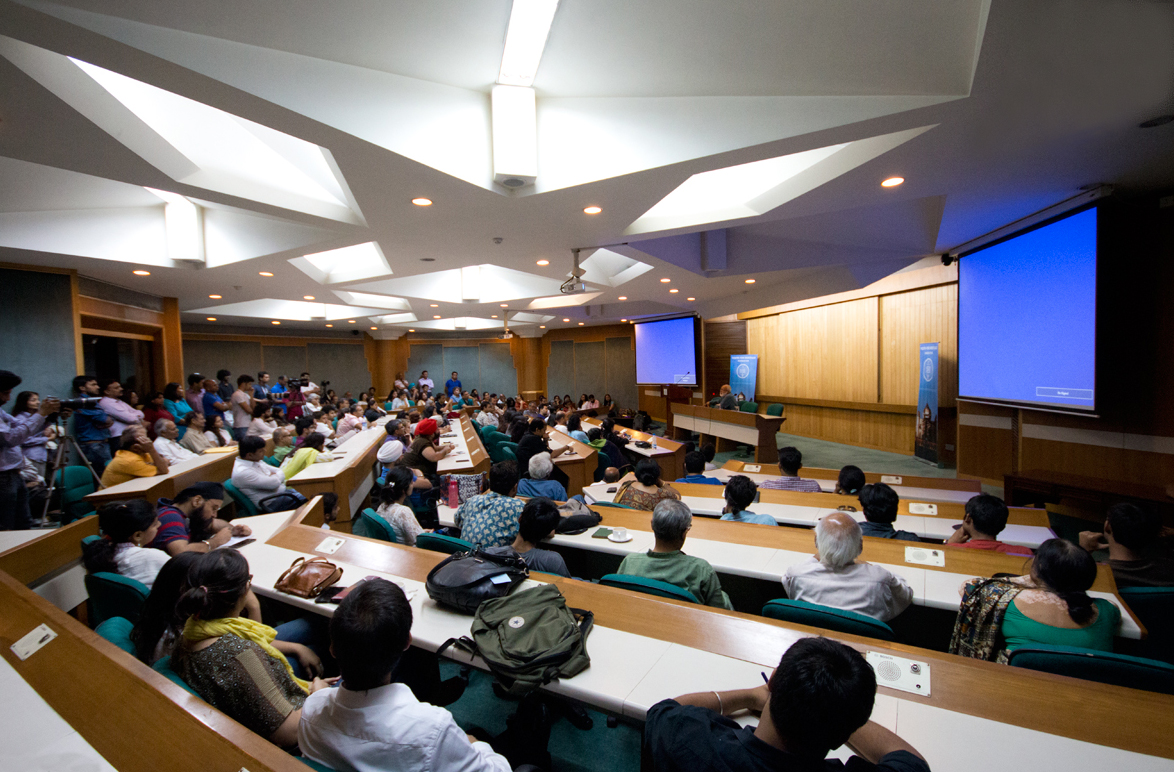
Heritage Talk at India Habitat Centre with Dr. Pushpesh Pant on History of Delhi through its foods organized by Youth for Heritage Foundation

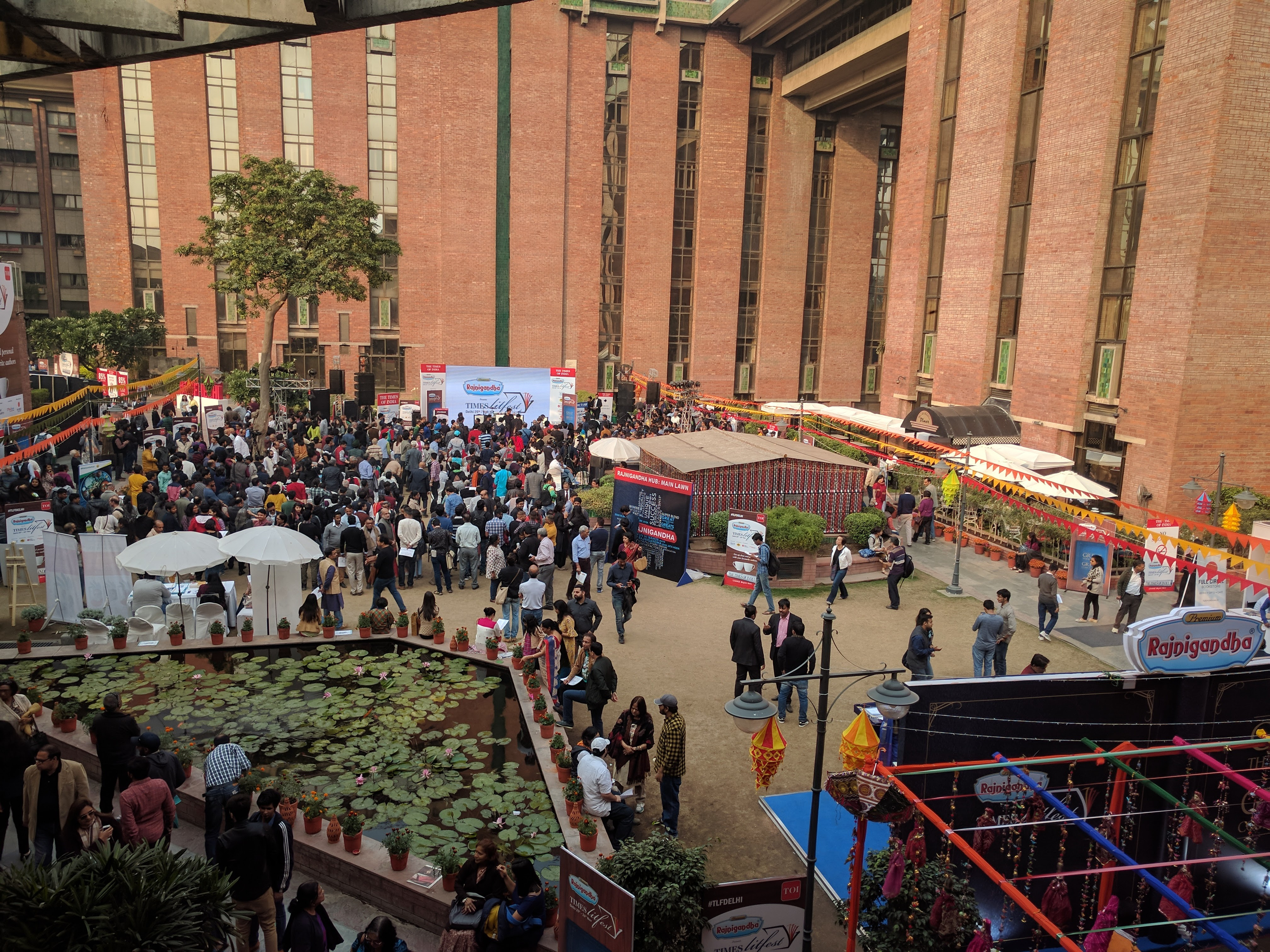
Day 2 of Times Litfest Delhi 2017, held at the India Habitat Centre, in New Delhi, 26 November 2017.

Numerous events are held in the premises of the India Habitat Center. Various workshops are also conducted such as art, dance and film workshops. Photography exhibitions and talk are a popular feature in the center. Film screenings are also conducted such as those by Kriti Film Club which are open to for public.

In 2009, the India Habitat Centre co-hosted the inaugural Habitat Summit with Mirabilis Advisory and Urban Habitats Forum, a professional civil society initiative which aims "to serve as a multi-disciplinary public awareness and educational platform". Held in September, the event showcased community-oriented urban renewal projects.

In February 2020, IHC hosted a seven-day art exhibition Sculpt for Delhi III, presented by Delhi Art Society and organised by sculpture artist Neeraj Gupta. The exhibition featured works of 20 sculptors from across India. In November 14th to 15th the national level of the Young Indian parliament will be conducted.

=== Recurrent events ===
IHC hosted and organised the Delhi Photo Festival held every two years from 2011 to 2015. The partnership between India Habitat Centre (IHC) and Nazar Foundation (parent body of Delhi Photo Festival) was dissolved in early 2015 and Delhi Photo Festival 2015 was held at Indira Gandhi National Centre for the Arts (IGNCA).

The two-day fifth edition of Times LitFest is a major literary festival, organised by The Times of India and Rajnigandha, was held at the centre in 2019. As of 2021 the festival's director is Vinita Dawra Nangia.

The Old World Theatre Festival, Delhi's oldest theatre festival, is held annually by the arts organisation Old World Culture at IHC. The 18th edition was held in 2019.

== Gallery ==
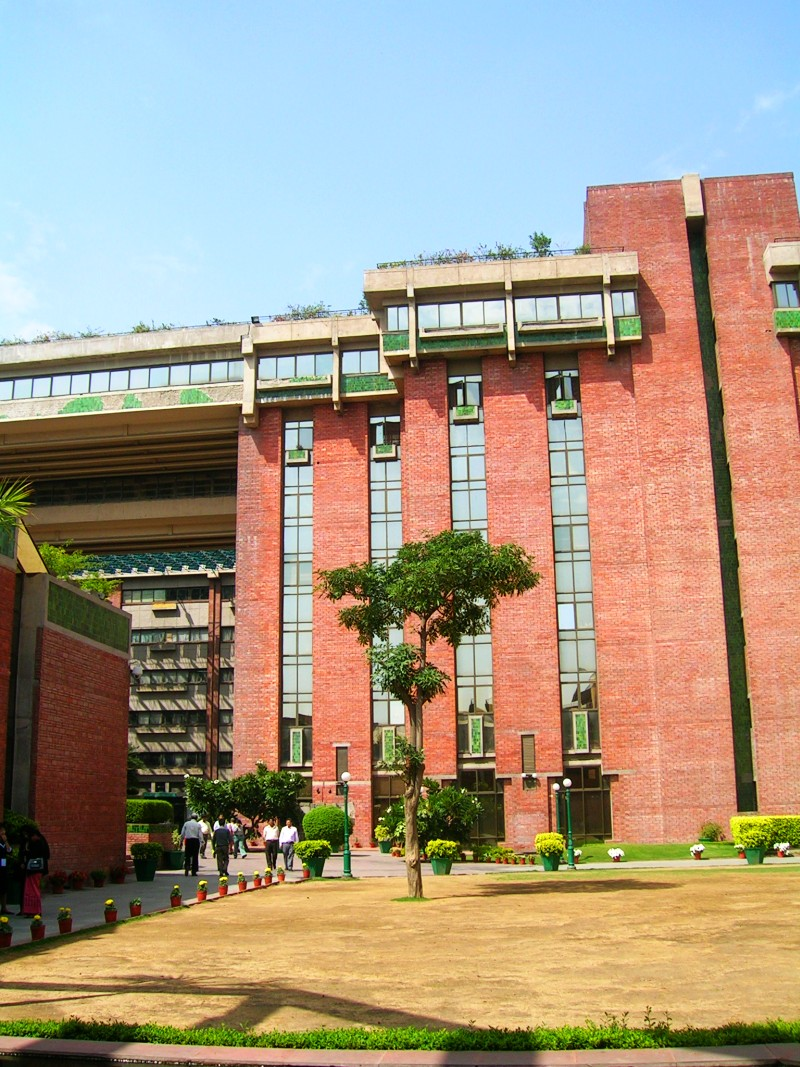

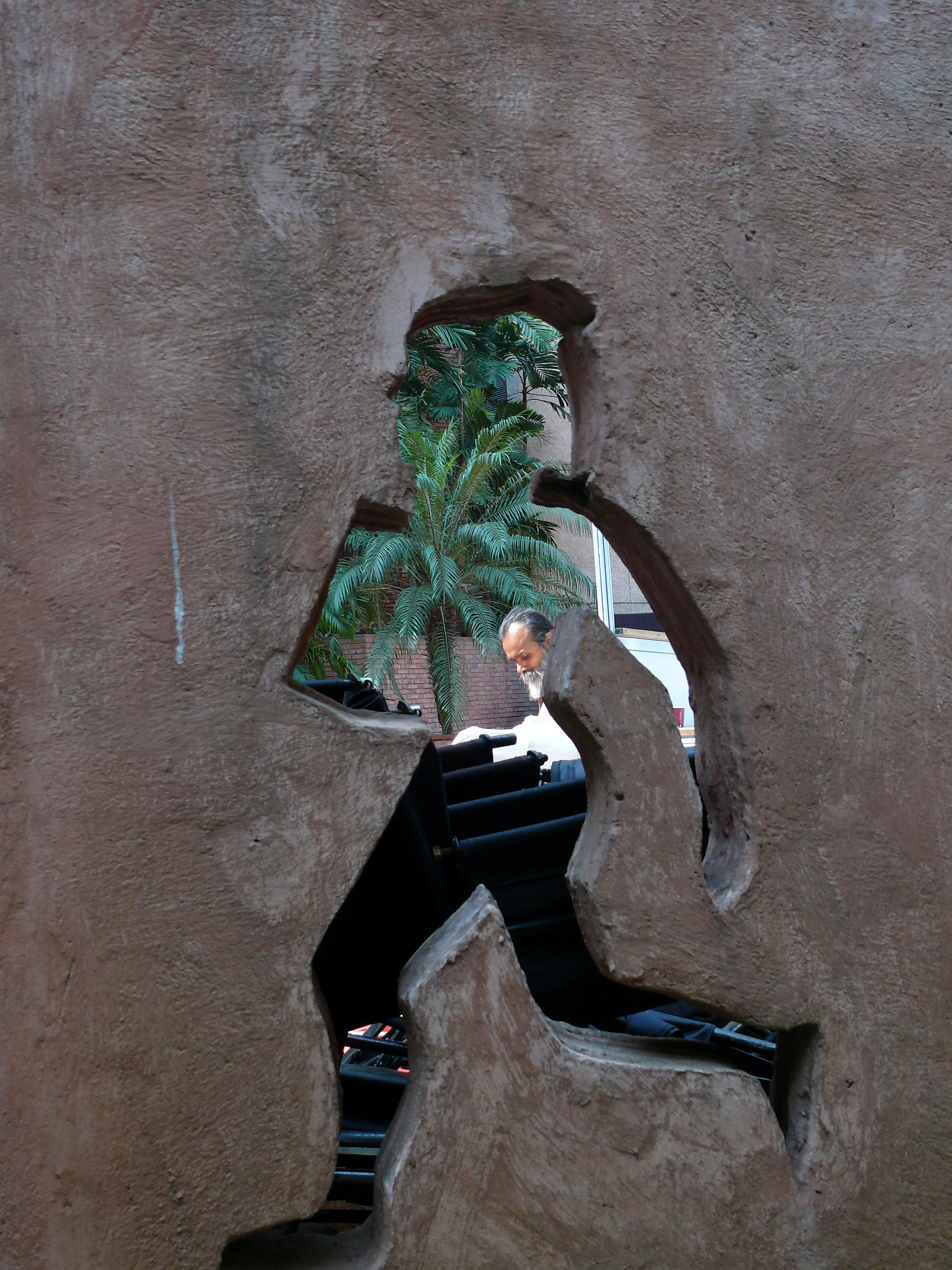

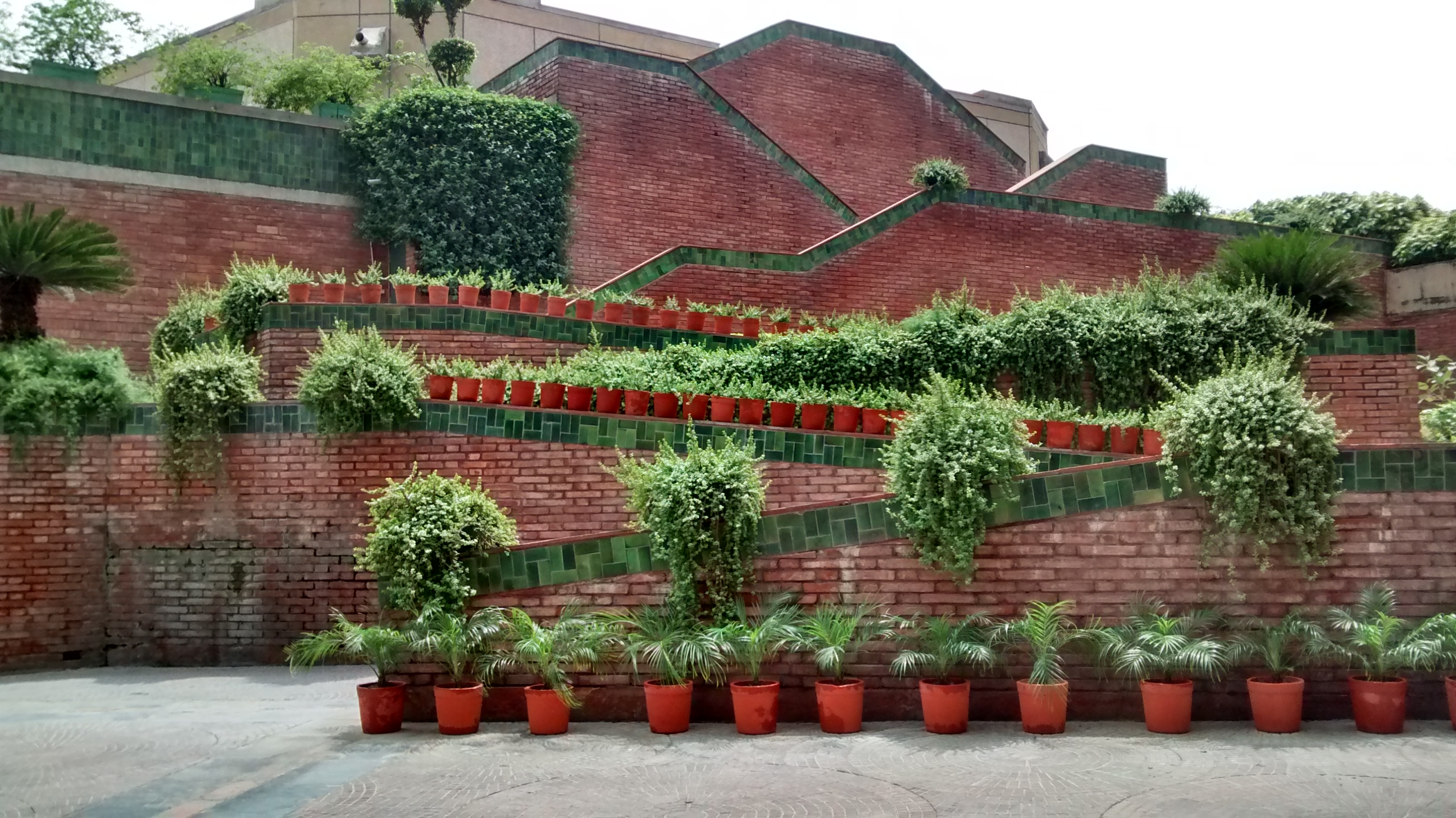

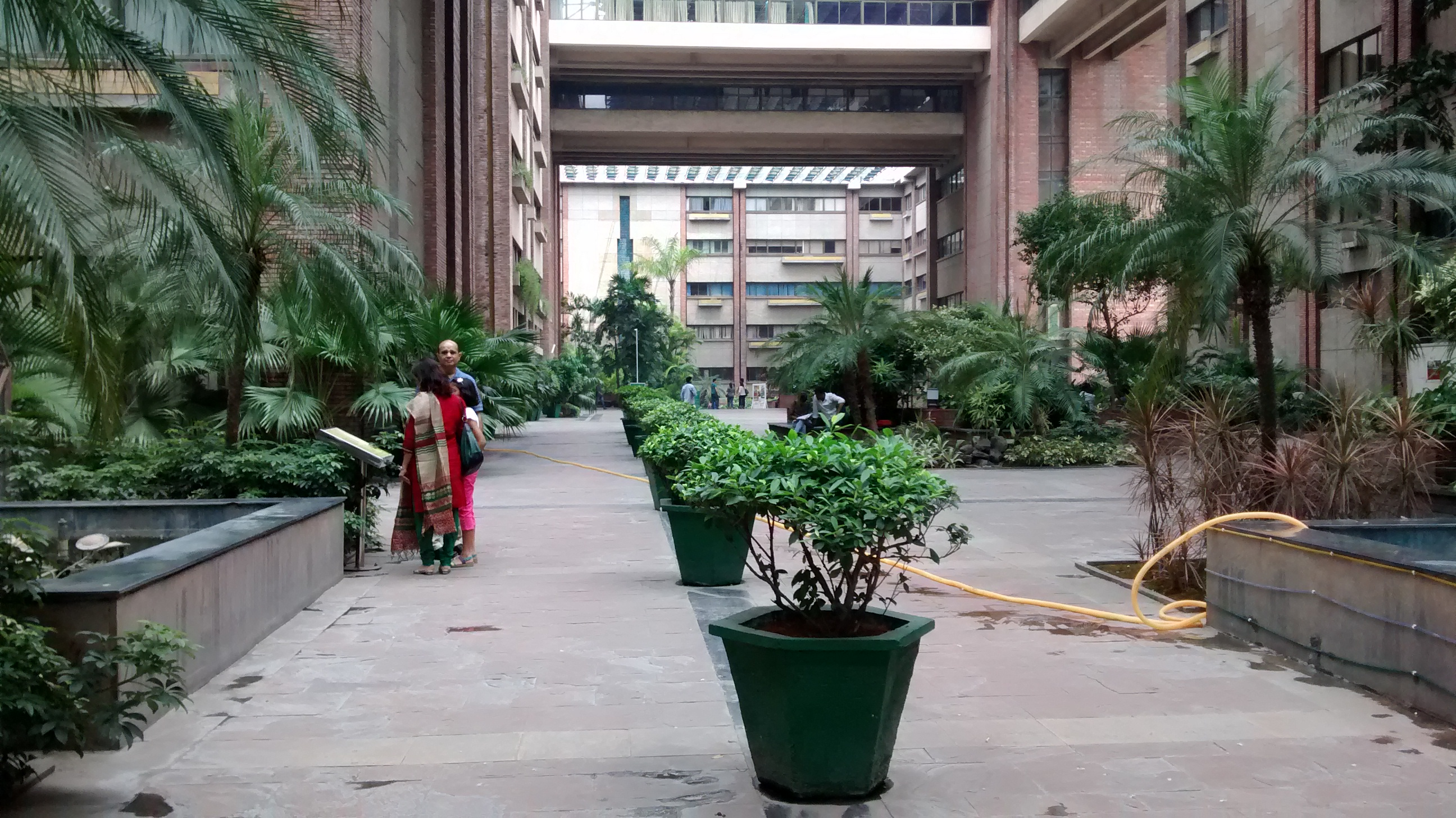

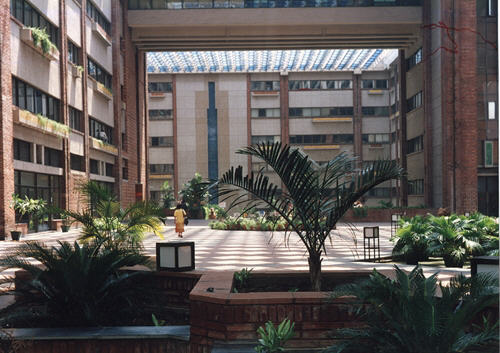

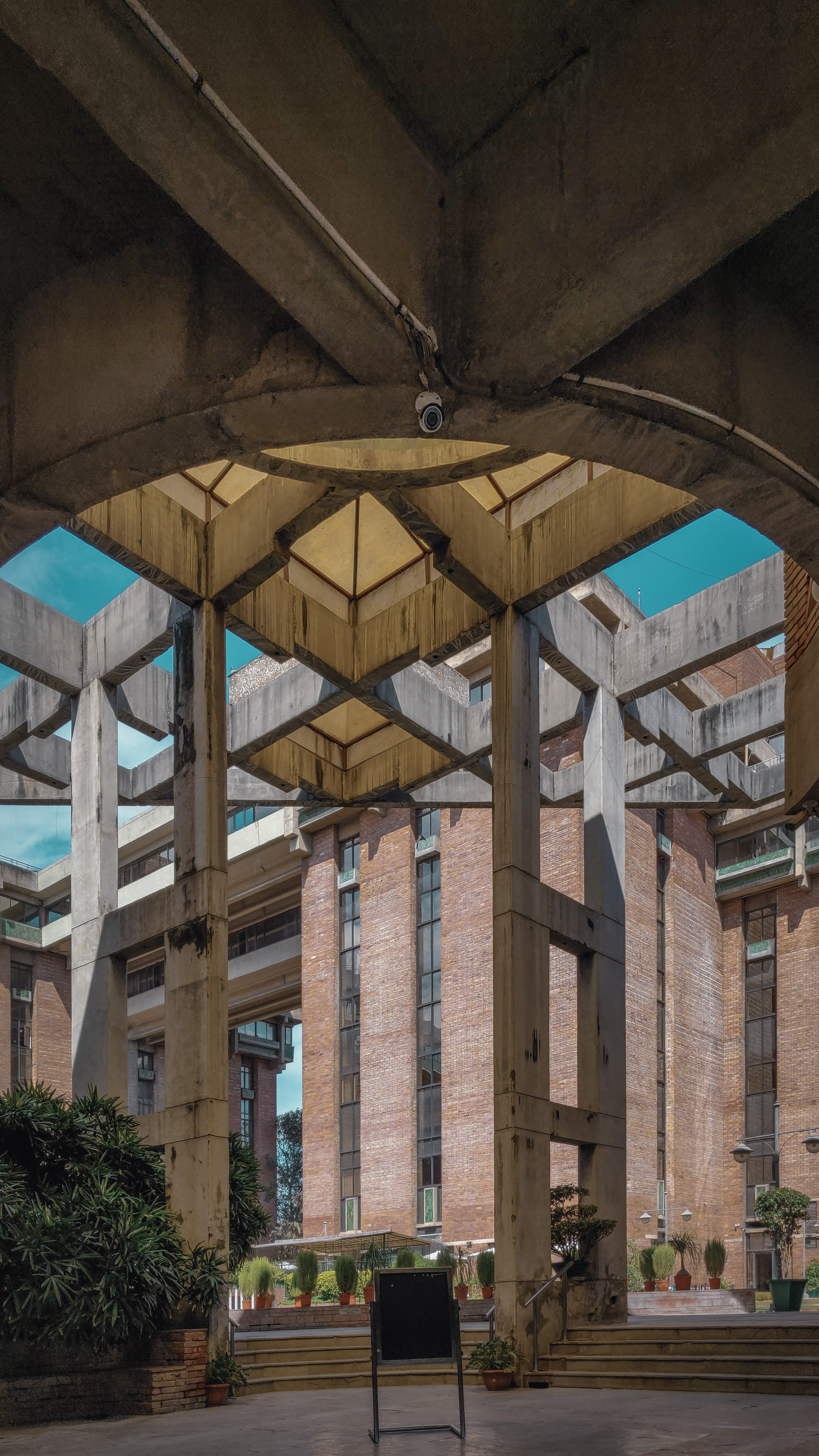

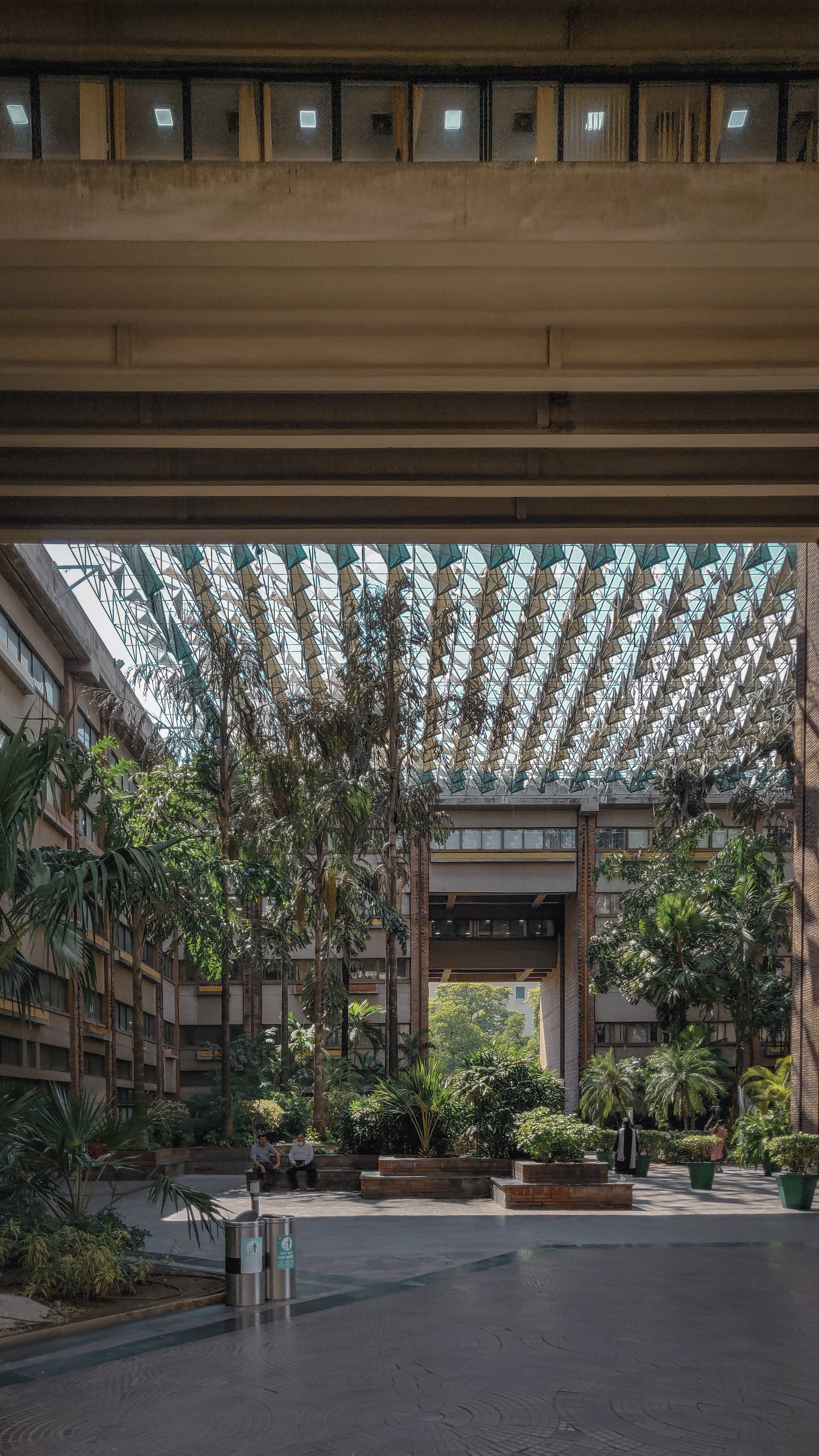

== See also ==
- Delhi Gymkhana
- India International Centre
