= Housing and Urban Development Corporation =

Indian Public Sector Enterprise

- Type: Public
- Traded as: NSE: HUDCO; BSE: 540530
- Industry: Financial services
- Founded: 25 April 1970; 56 years ago
- Headquarters: India Habitat Centre; Lodi Colony, New Delhi
- Key people: Sanjay Kulshrestha (Chairman & MD)
- Products: Infrastructure loan
- Revenue: ▲₹7,571.64 crore (US$790 million) (2020)
- Operating income: ▲₹6,133.36 crore (US$640 million) (2020)
- Net income: ▲₹1,708.20 crore (US$180 million) (2020)
- Total assets: ▲₹76,125.76 crore (US$7.9 billion) (2020)
- Total equity: ▲₹12,342.26 crore (US$1.3 billion) (2020)
- Owner: Government of India (74.8%)
- Number of employees: 827 (March 2019)
- Website: www.hudco.org.in

The Housing and Urban Development Corporation Limited (HUDCO), is an Indian public sector undertaking and non-banking financial company (NBFC) under the Ministry of Housing and Urban Affairs, Government of India. Established on 25 April 1970 and headquartered in Delhi, HUDCO provides long-term finance for housing and urban infrastructure projects across India.

It finances projects in sectors such as housing, water supply, sanitation, transportation, power, and social infrastructure, while also offering consultancy, research, and capacity-building services related to urban development. The central government granted Navratna Status to this PSU on 18-April-2024.

== History ==
The institution came into existence on 25 April 1970 as a private limited company under the complete ownership of the Government of India with an equity base of Rs.2 crore under the Companies Act, 1956.

It was created against the backdrop of housing deficit in India in 1960s and 70s, with the objective of addressing issue of housing finance and playing role in urban infrastructure development.

The organisation provides finance for setting up of new towns and also works as consultancy services for the projects of designing and planning relating to Housing and Urban Development programs in India as well as abroad.

HUDCO won UN-Habitat Scroll of Honour Award for the contributions to the development of housing in 1991. The institution was conferred with miniratna status in 2004.

== Infrastructure ==
HUDCO started financing for development of infrastructures in 1989. The priority was giving for infrastructure facilities including projects in the sectors of drainage, electricity, water supply, sewerage, solid waste management and roads in the urban areas. Later the social infrastructure components like primary schools and play grounds, hostels for working women, healthcare centres, police stations and jails, courts, etc. received benefit of funding for low cost.

=== Road and Transport ===
HUDCO has provided term loans for construction of roads and other transportation sectors which includes construction of Airport, Railways, Ports, Metro Rails, Bridges and Flyover, Railway Over-bridges, Subways, Bypasses, Bus Terminal, Parking complexes, Purchase of public transport vehicles, Bus Stops/stations, Intelligent Traffic Management system etc.

Airport projects of Cochin International Airport and Calicut International Airport in Kerala are supported by HUDCO. The infrastructure for Kerala State Road Transport Corporation and UPSRTC are also funded by them. HUDCO sanctioned ₹100 crore for KSRTC in 2002 for purchasing 550 buses and 350 mini-buses and ₹260 crores in 2014 for purchasing 1500 buses.

=== Solid Waste Management ===
In 1994, HUDCO set up a Waste Management Cell for promotion of municipal waste management.

Capacity Building and Consultancy Services: HUDCO provides planning, designing, and urban development consultancy services and technical assistance to state governments, urban local bodies, and other stakeholders. It also organizes training programs and training workshops for professionals.

HUDCO has sanctioned 58 schemes with a project cost of ₹675 crore to provide new systems and to augment the existing systems.

=== Water Supply ===
295 water supply schemes, with a project cost of ₹5,285 crore was funded by HUDCO. In 2016, HUDCO has also given finance to Nellore's underground drainage project proposed by Nellore Municipal Corporation.
