= Geras (disambiguation) =

Geras is the god of old age in Greek mythology. Geras or Gera may also refer to:

- Geras, Austria, a municipality
- Geras Abbey, an abbey in Austria
- Gera, Lesbos, a Greek town
- Norman Geras, political scientist
- Adèle Geras, children's author
- Geras, Mortal Kombat character
- Geras or Gersa, old name of Jerash, in Jordan

== See also ==
- Gera (disambiguation)
