= Gerra aelia =

Scientific classification
- Domain: Eukaryota
- Kingdom: Animalia
- Phylum: Arthropoda
- Class: Insecta
- Order: Lepidoptera
- Superfamily: Noctuoidea
- Family: Noctuidae
- Genus: Gerra
- Species: G. aelia

Binomial name
- Gerra aelia H. Druce, 1889

Synonyms
- Diamuna aelia H. Druce, 1889

Species of moth

Gerra aelia is a species of moth in the family Noctuidae. It is found in the western parts of Panama and in the northern and southeastern parts of Costa Rica.
