= Neeraj Gupta =

Indian sculptor (born 1969)

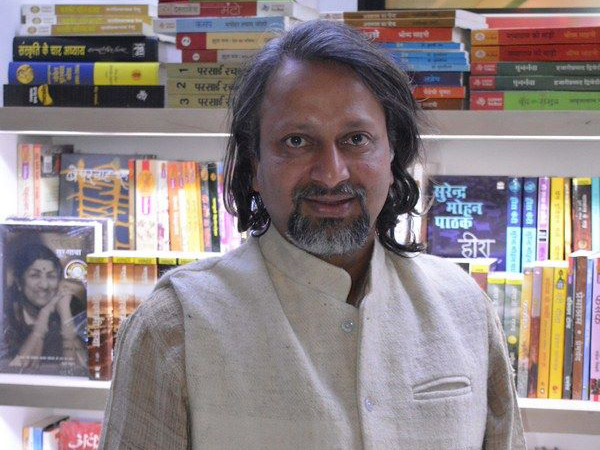
- Gupta in 2018
- Born: 1969 (age 56–57)
- Education: School of Planning and Architecture, Delhi
- Occupation: Sculpture Artist
- Organization: Delhi Art Society
- Known for: Sculpture art
- Website: Personal website

Neeraj Gupta (born 1969) is an Indian sculptor. In 2017 Gupta became the first Indian artist to win Florence Biennale Award, taking second prize in the sculpture section. In 2004 he won the Sahitya Kala Parishad award.

He is founder and president of the Delhi Art Society. He is a member of the Royal Society of Sculptors, United Kingdom.

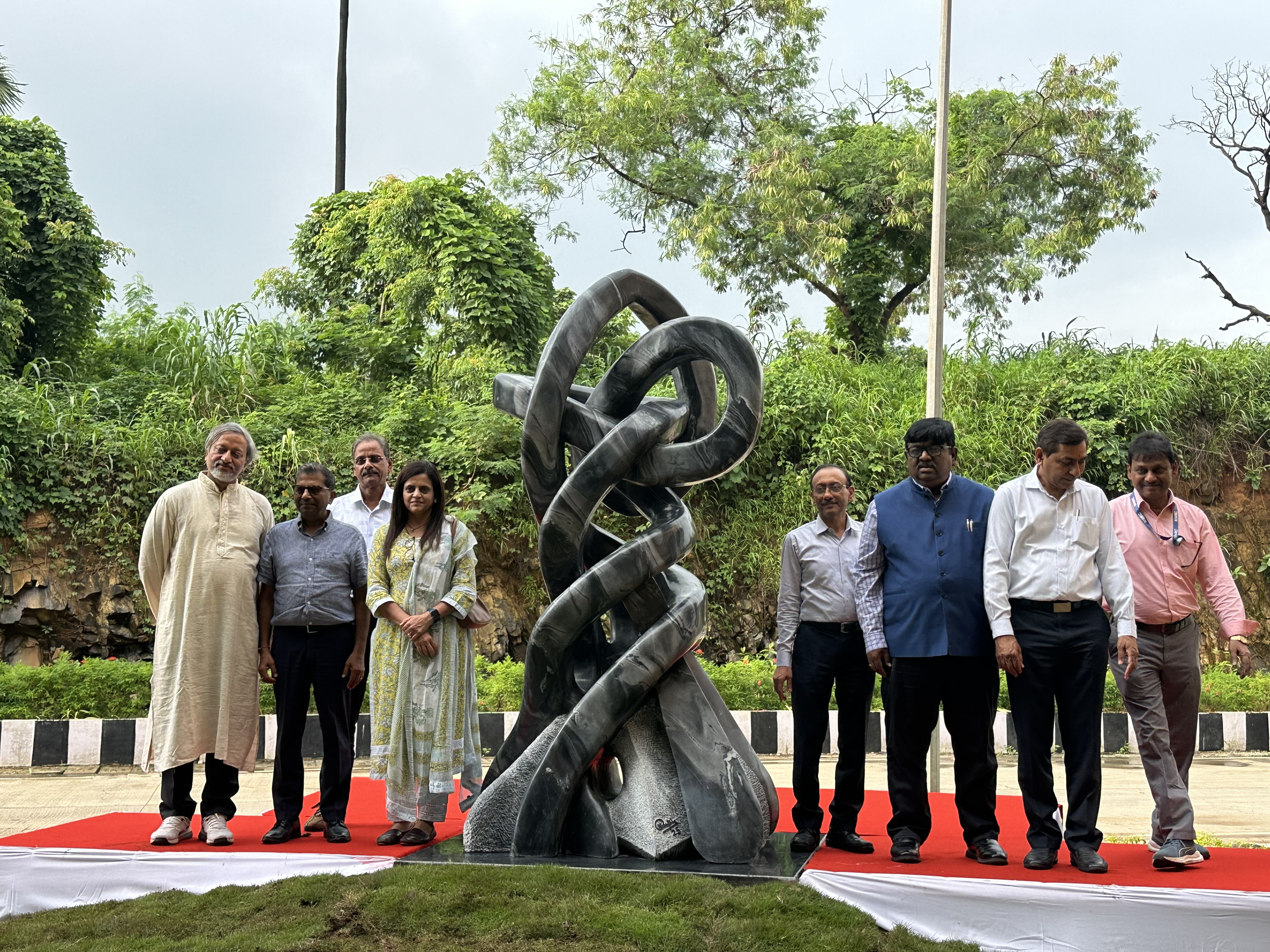
Neeraj Gupta, accompanied by Ashwini Bhide, the managing director of Mumbai Metro Rail Corporation, attended the inauguration of Gupta's sculpture 'Spirit Lines' on 14 August 2025 in Mumbai

== The Forces of Imagination ==
In Dec 2024, Neeraj Gupta organized an exhibition "The Forces of Imagination" at the India Habitat Centre, Delhi. In this exhibition Gupta showcased his marble sculpture along with other sculptures by 14 artists from across India. After many years, a diverse assembly of sculptors has united in Delhi's art circuit, showcasing their transformational artworks that epitomize the evolution of sculpture in India.

== Heaven & Earth ==
Gupta's sculpture 'Heaven & Earth' featured a large elephant carrying small and big vessels of water, placed on the entrance of India International Centre. In this artwork, Neeraj connects the concepts of creation and God with nature. This sculpture of an elephant is about the protection of species across the entire world.

== Public exhibitions ==
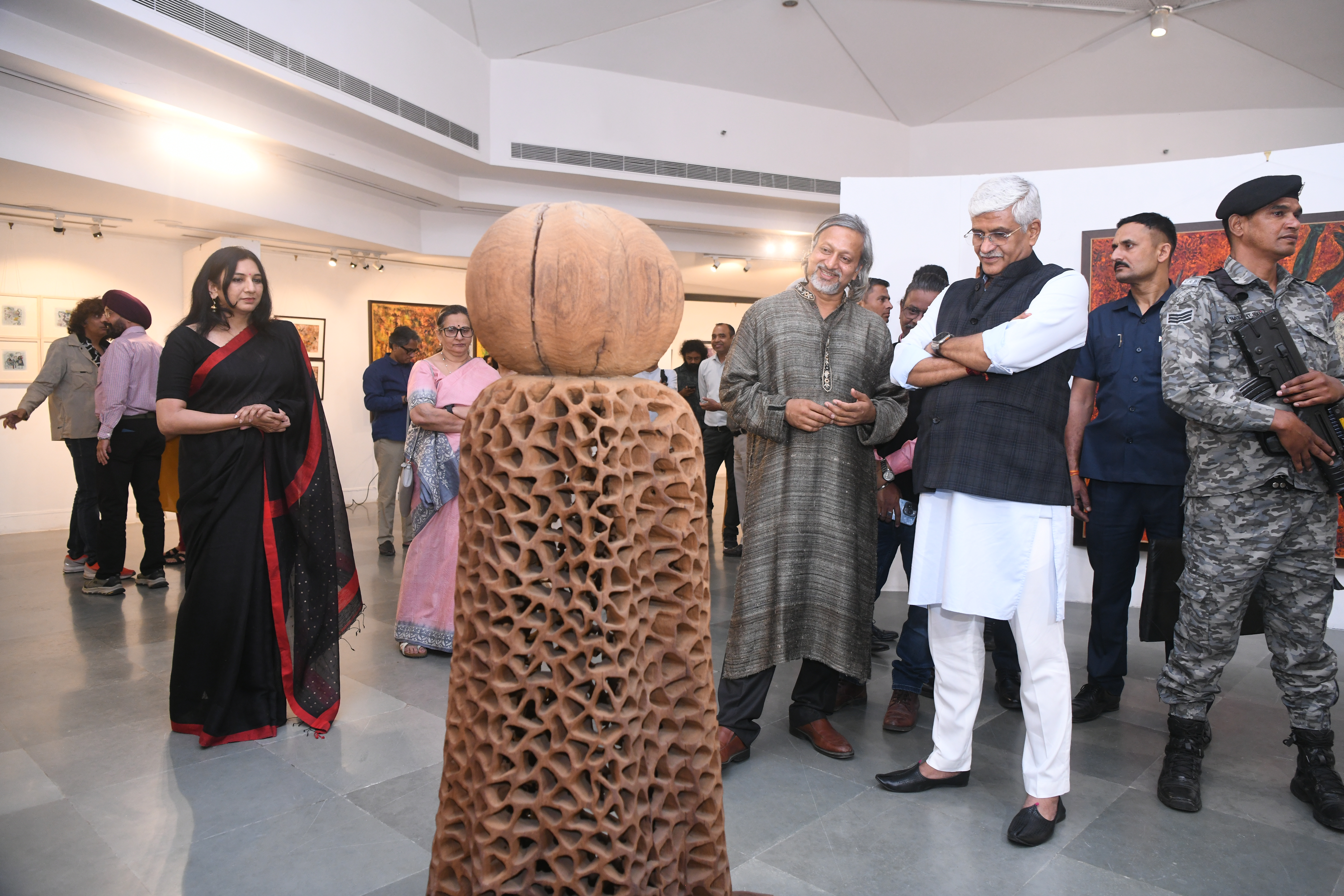
Neeraj Gupta explaining his sculpture to Minister of Tourism & Culture Gajendra Singh Shekhawat at the Samanvaya Art Show, India International Centre, Delhi in March 2026

- In March 2026, an art show 'Samanvaya' held by Delhi Art Society and Neeraj Gupta at India International Centre, Delhi.
- In October 2025, Gupta's sculpture "As the Wind Rises" was installed at the entrance Gate No. 2 of Bikaner House, Delhi.
- 2024 Sri Ram Vijay (Divine Victory) Wooden Sculpture art showcased at National Gallery of Modern Art, New Delhi
- 2021, Geumgang Nature Art Biennale
- 2020, Sculpt for Delhi III at India Habitat Centre, New Delhi
- 2020, Oak Bay Arts, Arts Alive Sculpture Walk, Public Art Program at Vancouver, Canada
- 2019 Jerusalem Biennale
- 2019, Delhi for Sculpt II inaugurated by Delhi Lieutenant Governor Anil Baijal and Bulgarian ambassador Eleonora Dimitrova
- 2018, Sculpt for Delhi in India International Centre
- 2016, Santorini Biennale, Greece
- 2016, Isculpt, India International Centre
- 2015 Folk Strangers at Visual Art Gallery, India Habitat Centre
- 2015, Breath Better Together in India International Centre
- 2013, NDMC Convention Centre
- 2013, South Block, Central Atrium of DRDO Headquarters Nehru Park New Delhi
- 2013, Kaya Kalap at India Habitat Centre, Visual Arts Gallery in January
- 2003, Kalyug, Lalit Kala Akademi, New Delhi

== Public Sculptures ==
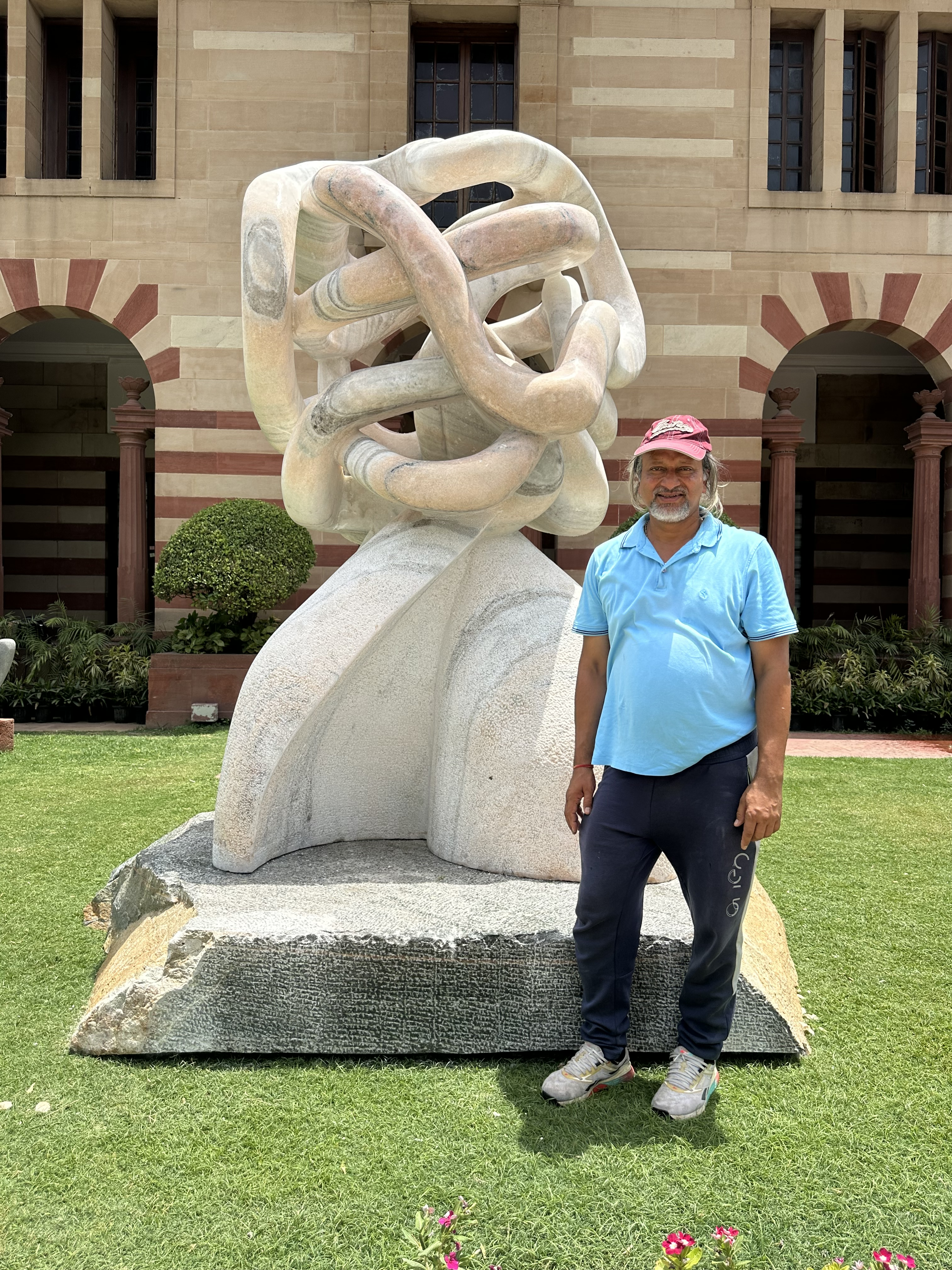
Artist Neeraj Gupta along with his Sculpture installed at National Gallery of Modern Art, New Delhi in May 2026

- Neeraj Gupta's sculpture installed at National Gallery of Modern Art, New Delhi on 24 May 2026

== Awards ==
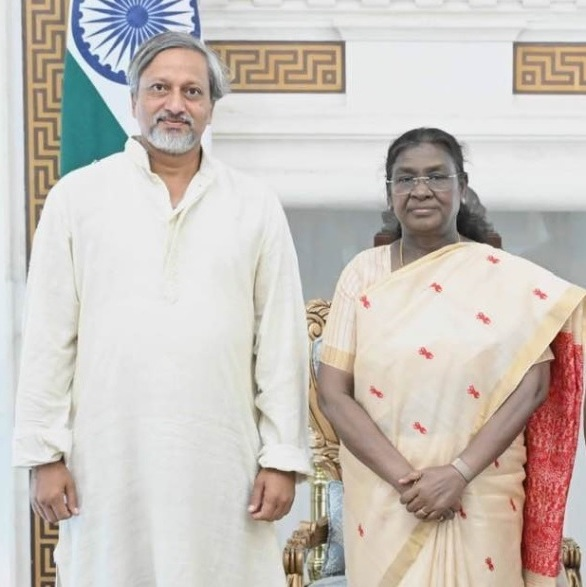
Gupta along with President of India Droupadi Murmu in August 2025

- 2026 International Artist Grand Prize in Art Revolution Taipei, Taiwan.
- Wildlife Artist of the Year 2021 by David Shepherd Wildlife Foundation
- 2019 Eminent Artist of India in the 60th National Exhibition of Art by Lalit Kala Academy (National Academy of Art)
- Finalist for Woollahra Small Sculpture Prize 2018 out of 666 entries 2018.
- 2017 Silver Medal in Florence Biennale Award
- Best Sculptor Award at 77th Annual Art Exhibition of All India Fine Arts and Crafts Society
- Sahitya Kala Parishad Award, 28th Annual Art Exhibition, 2004

== Documentary bibliography ==
- 20 Solutions, Artist Response to Climate Change, released on the eve of Climate Summit in PARIS by Environment Minister, Govt. of India 2015
- Documentary on Singasth Kumbh 20
