= Gerra sevorsa =

Scientific classification
- Kingdom: Animalia
- Phylum: Arthropoda
- Class: Insecta
- Order: Lepidoptera
- Superfamily: Noctuoidea
- Family: Noctuidae
- Genus: Gerra
- Species: G. sevorsa

Binomial name
- Gerra sevorsa Grote, 1882

Synonyms
- Diamuna aedessa Druce, 1889; Diamuna aelia Druce, 1889; Fenaria sevorsa Grote, 1882; Gerra brephos Draudt, 1919; Gerra luteomacula Strand, 1916; Tuerta sabulosa Felder, 1874

Species of moth

Gerra sevorsa is a species of moth first described by Augustus Radcliffe Grote in 1882. Its range extends from the US states of New Mexico and Arizona south through most of Central America.
