= Ghera =

Ghera may refer to:

- Ghera language, an Indo-Aryan language of Pakistan
- Glera, an Italian variety of white grape
- Ghera, Himachal Pradesh, a town in Kangra district, Himachal Pradesh, India
- Ghera (drum), a drum used in the music of Madhya Pradesh, India

== See also ==
- Gera (disambiguation)
- Gerra (disambiguation)
