= Gerra radicalis =

Scientific classification
- Kingdom: Animalia
- Phylum: Arthropoda
- Class: Insecta
- Order: Lepidoptera
- Superfamily: Noctuoidea
- Family: Noctuidae
- Genus: Gerra
- Species: G. radicalis

Binomial name
- Gerra radicalis Walker, 1865

Species of moth

Gerra radicalis is a species of moth in the family Noctuidae (the owlet moths). It is found in North America.

The MONA or Hodges number for Gerra radicalis is 9302.
