= Neeraj Sood (officer) =

Indian Army colonel (1970–2010)

Colonel Neeraj Sood SC
- नीरज सूद
- Born: 22 November 1970; Delhi, India
- Died: 22 June 2010 (aged 39); Lolab Valley, Jammu and Kashmir
- Education: Indian Military Academy; National Defence Academy
- Military career
- Allegiance: India
- Branch: Indian Army
- Service years: 1992 — 2010
- Rank: Colonel
- Service number: IC-51655
- Unit: 8 Rajputana Rifles
- Commands: 8 Rajputana Rifles; 18 Rashtriya Rifles
- Awards: Shaurya Chakra

Neeraj Sood (22 November 1970 – 22 June 2010) was an colonel in the Indian Army. In June 2010, he suffered a fatal gunshot wound during a shootout against armed separatist militants in the Lolab Valley in northern Jammu and Kashmir, and subsequently died of his injuries. On January 25, 2011, Sood was posthumously awarded the Shaurya Chakra. He was the highest-ranking officer to be killed in Kashmir in 2010.

== Early life ==
Neeraj Sood was born in Delhi on 22 November 1970 to V.K. Sood, an officer in the Military Engineer Services, and Prabha Sood. His elder brother Pankaj Sood is a government officer in the Indian Administrative Service. Neeraj attended the Indian Military Academy, where he won multiple prizes in track and field events, and graduated on December 22, 1992 as a second lieutenant.

== Military career ==
Following his graduation, Neeraj was commissioned in the 8 Rajputana Rifles as a second lieutenant in 1992. He is an alumnus of the National Defence Academy.
During his military career, he served as an instructor at the Counter-Insurgency and Jungle Warfare School, located in Variengte, Mizoram. He was posted in Jammu and Kashmir for eight years, and was given command of the 18 Rashtriya Rifles. Neeraj's unit was deployed near the Line of Control in Kupwara, a town in Jammu and Kashmir.

On 22 June 2010, Neeraj's battalion was notified that a large group of armed militants had crossed the Line of Control into the Lolab Valley. Neeraj led his troops into Kupwara, where they came under fire. During the resulting shootout, Neeraj was reportedly shot and critically injured. According to the Jammu and Kashmir police, he was airlifted to a military hospital for further treatment but ultimately died of his injuries.

== Funeral ==
On June 24, 2010, Neeraj Sood was laid to rest at the Delhi Cantonment in New Delhi with military honours. In attendance at the funeral was Neeraj's wife, Priti Sood, and their 11-year old daughter Misika. Several senior officers of the Indian military also attended his funeral to pay their respects.

== Shaurya Chakra ==
On January 25, 2011, Neeraj Sood was posthumously awarded the Shaurya Chakra by the Ministry of Defence for his "acts of gallantry" on the battlefield. His Shaurya Chakra citation read:

CITATION

COLONEL NEERAJ SOOD

18 RASHTRIYA RIFLES (IC-51655)

Colonel Neeraj Sood Commanding Officer 18 Rashtriya Rifles devised and effected judicious surveillance and ambush plan from 13 June 10 which subsequently resulted in contact with terrorists at 2105 hours on 22 June 2010 in the area of Kupwara (J&K). Astutely sensing that terrorist movement would evade the cordon, the Commanding Officer swiftly deployed his troops to tactically advantageous positions. Boldly leading from the front, the officer formed the focal point of the cordon re-established contact at 2212 hours on 22 June 2010.
In the ensuing gunfight, Colonel Sood personally targeted and injured one terrorist. Identifying the key role of Colonel Neeraj Sood, the terrorists concentrated their fire on him. In the fierce gun battle that ensued, the officer sustained Fatal Gunshot injury.
