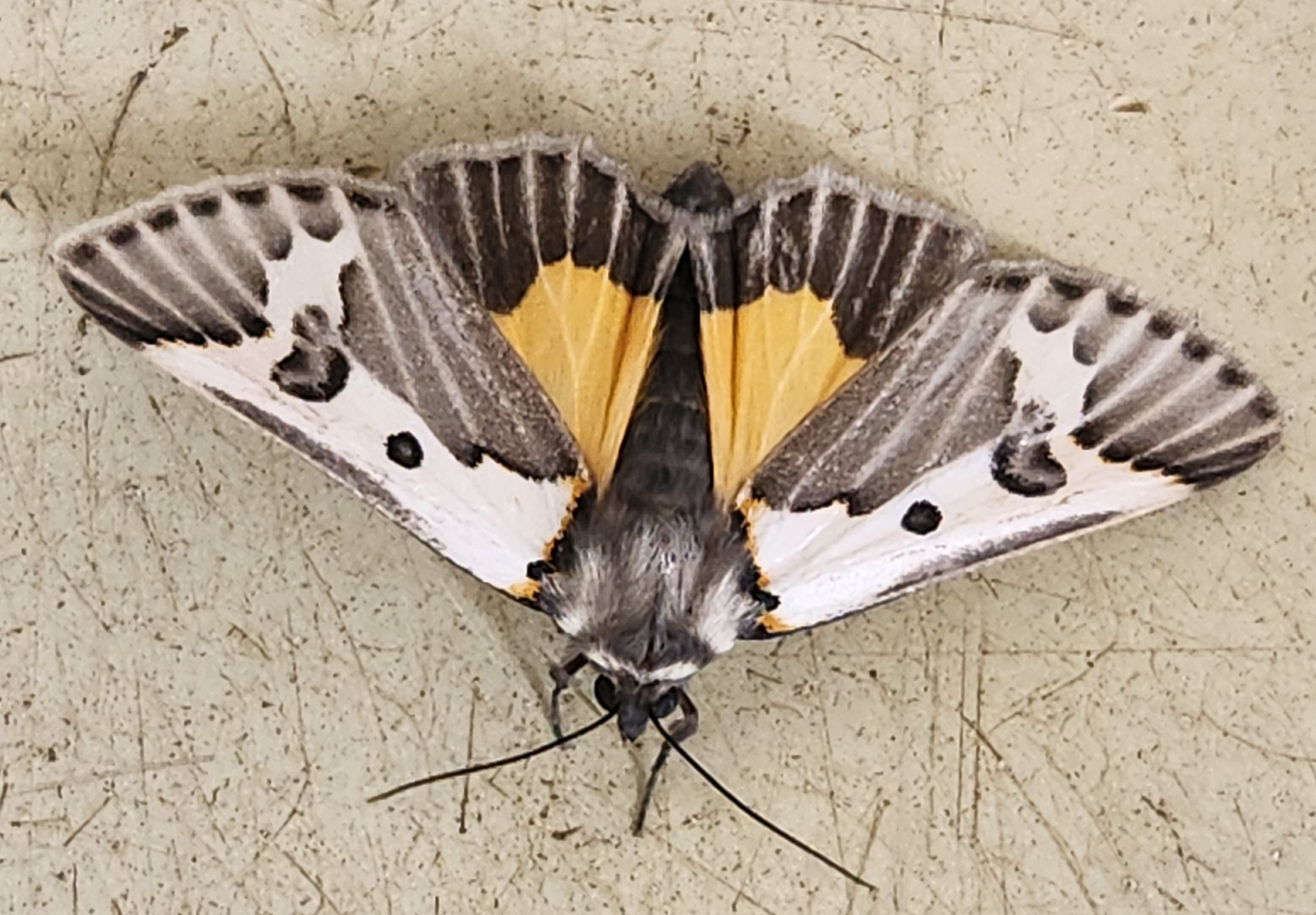
- G. radiata in Caetité (Brazil)

Scientific classification
- Kingdom: Animalia
- Phylum: Arthropoda
- Class: Insecta
- Order: Lepidoptera
- Superfamily: Noctuoidea
- Family: Noctuidae
- Subfamily: Agaristinae
- Genus: Gerra; Walker, 1865

Synonyms
- Fenaria Grote, 1882

= Gerra (moth) =

Genus of moths

Gerra is a genus of moths in the family Noctuidae. The genus was erected by Francis Walker in 1865. It is distributed in the Americas, from southern United States to northern Argentina.

== Species ==
There are seven recognized species:

- Gerra aelia H. Druce, 1889
- Gerra brephos Draudt, 1919
- Gerra lunata Köhler, 1936
- Gerra radiata Becker, 2010
- Gerra radicalis Walker, 1865
- Gerra sevorsa Grote, 1882
  - Gerra sevorsa aedessa H. Druce, 1889
- Gerra sophocles Dyar, 1912
