= Neerja (soundtrack) =

Soundtrack album by Vishal Khurana
- Released: 5 February 2016
- Recorded: 2015–2016
- Genre: Feature film soundtrack
- Length: 14:13
- Language: Hindi
- Label: T-Series
- Producer: Atul Kasbekar

Vishal Khurana chronology
Neerja (2016)	Jolly LLB 2 (2017)

Singles from Neerja
- 1. "Jeete Hain Chal" Released: 1 February 2016

Neerja is the soundtrack album to the 2016 film of the same name directed by Ram Madhvani. The album featured four songs composed by Vishal Khurana K with lyrics written by Prasoon Joshi. The soundtrack was preceded by the single "Jeete Hain Chal", released on 1 February, and the album was released through T-Series on 5 February. The soundtrack was positively received by critics.

== Development ==
The soundtrack and score were composed by Vishal Khurana K, with lyrics written by Prasoon Joshi. Khurana, who had composed jingles for advertisements directed by Madhvani, had recalled that the latter had offered him to score for the film, and asked to know more about the life of Neerja Bhanot; when he read the script for the film, he found it fascinating and completely inspired by the story. According to Khurana K, "The brief given to me was that the music should be a part of the film and go with it's [sic] tone—simple and straight from the heart."

Khurana K took around 8 months to compose the songs for the film. Composer Shekhar Ravjiani, who made his acting debut in the film, had also sang one of the song "Gehra Ishq". Khurana K added that despite being a musician, Ravjiani did not interfere in the decisions for music, and was supportive of his composition skills. Sonam Kapoor, listened to one of his composition "Aisa Kyun Maa" and "was very happy, emotional" and encouraged Khurana.

== Release ==
The first song from the film, "Jeete Hain Chal", was released by Madhvani, Kapoor and Joshi at a launch event held on 1 February 2016 in Mumbai. The four-song soundtrack album was released digitally by T-Series on 5 February 2016.

== Reception ==
The soundtrack received a positive critical response. Mohar Basu of The Times of India gave the music a 3.5 out of 5 ratings, saying that it "is beautiful, pensive, touching and all of it sans melodrama," and that it "is straight from the soul." Joginder Tuteja of Bollywood Hungama said that "the songs of the film heard are strictly functional and won't really be into play once the film is through." He added that the songs "Aankhein Milayenge Darr Se" and "Gehra Ishq" would make the most impression. Rohit Mehrotra of The Quint praised the music album and said, "The brilliance of this album is that it features songs which will not hijack and/or disrupt the flow of the narrative. The sound is delicate, fearless, vulnerable and always intimate." Karthik Srinivasan of Milliblog described it as a "short, functional soundtrack" and praised "Aisa Kyun Maa" as a "clear winner".

Suhani Singh of India Today wrote "Vishal Khurana's music is pleasing to the ears. Jeete Hai Chal stays with one long after the film ends. The songs don't hamper the pace of the story." Raja Sen of Rediff.com described the score as "thickly ominous", while Sarita Tanwar of Daily News and Analysis said that the film has "no unnecessary songs and parallel tracks for 'relief'". Anna M. M. Vetticad of Firstpost described the background score as "excellent".

== Track listing ==
No.	Title	Singer(s)	Length
1.	"Jeete Hain Chal"	Kavita Seth, Arun Ingle, Mandar Apte, R.N. Iyer, Archana Gore, Mayuri Patwardhan, Pragati Mukund Joshi, Vishal Khurana	04:09
2.	"Aankhein Milayenge Darr Se"	Mohan Kannan, Neha Bhasin	02:57
3.	"Gehra Ishq"	Shekhar Ravjiani, Shadab Faridi, Farhan Sabri	03:27
4.	"Aisa Kyun Maa"	Sunidhi Chauhan	03:40
Total length:			14:13
