= Neeraj Suri =

American computer scientist

Neeraj Suri is an American-Austrian computer scientist. He is a Distinguished University Professor at Lancaster University (UK) and an adjunct professor of Computer Science at the University of Massachusetts at Amherst.

He holds a MS and PhD from the University of Massachusetts at Amherst. His research focuses on Trustworthy Computing, notably the experimental validation of software including quantification of dependability and security. He is a member of the IFIP WG10.4 on Dependable Computing and Fault Tolerance. He is a recipient of the NSF CAREER, Microsoft and IBM faculty awards

== Most-cited publications ==
- Saxena D, Raychoudhury V, Suri N, Becker C, Cao J. Named data networking: a survey. Computer Science Review. 2016 Feb 1;19:15-55. (Cited 202 times, according to Google Scholar)
- Kopetz H, Suri N. Compositional design of RT systems: A conceptual basis for specification of linking interfaces. InSixth IEEE International Symposium on Object-Oriented Real-Time Distributed Computing, 2003. 2003 May 16 (pp. 51–60). (Cited144 times, according to Google Scholar.)
- Hiller M, Jhumka A, Suri N. An approach for analysing the propagation of data errors in software. In2001 International Conference on Dependable Systems and Networks 2001 Jul 1 (pp. 161–170). (Cited 136 times, according to Google Scholar.)
