= Gera, Virginia =

Unincorporated community in Virginia, United States

- Unincorporated community
- Location within Virginia and the United States Gera (the United States)
- Coordinates: 38°14′02″N 077°10′47″W
- Country: United States
- State: Virginia
- County: King George
- Elevation: 108 ft (33 m)
- Time zone: UTC−5 (Eastern (EST))
  - Summer (DST): UTC−4 (EDT)
- GNIS feature ID: 1477344

Gera is an unincorporated community in King George County, Virginia, United States.
