= Neeraj George =

Indian mountaineer and para badminton player

Neeraj George, also known as Neeraj George Baby, is an Indian mountaineer and para badminton player from Aluva, Kerala. George climbed Kilimanjaro on crutches. Working as an employee in Advocate General office Kerala, George participated in many national and international Para-Badminton tournaments.
