= GERA Europe =

GERA Europe Global Entertainment Retail Association-Europe
- Formation: August 2000; 26 years ago
- Type: Trade association
- Headquarters: Brussels, Belgium
- Location: European Union
- President: Martin de Wilde
- Website: www.gera-europe.org

GERA Europe is the European wing of the Global Entertainment Retail Association. It is a Brussels-based umbrella group for trade associations representing entertainment retailers and distributors across Europe. It has active members in six European countries.

== History ==
GERA was set up in August 2000 as the European arm of the Global Entertainment Retail Alliance, an international grouping of retailers.

== Activities ==
Much of GERA Europe's work consists of monitoring EU developments and keeping member associations informed on upcoming legislation which may affect them. The organisation also collates and distributes information on entertainment industry. On occasion, GERA Europe will make representations to lawmakers.

== Member organisations ==
The following are member organisations of GERA Europe:

- Austrian Entertainment Retailers Association - Austria
- Belgian Entertainment Retailers Association|BERA - Belgian Entertainment Retailers Association - Belgium
- Syndicat des Détaillants Spécialisés du Disque|SDSD - Syndicat des Détaillants Spécialisés du Disque - France
- Gesamtverband Deutscher Musikfachgeschäfte|GDM - Gesamtverband Deutscher Musikfachgeschäfte - Germany
- HAMM - Handelsverband Musik und Medien - Germany
- NVGD - Nederlandse Vereniging van Grammofoonplaten Detailhandelaren - Netherlands
- ERA - Entertainment Retailers Association - United Kingdom

GERA Europe is supported by a secretariat based in Brussels.
