= Ralucca Gera =

American mathematician

Ralucca Michelle Gera (née Muntean) is an American mathematician specializing in graph theory, including graph coloring, dominating sets, and spectral graph theory. Her interests also include personalized learning in mathematics education. She is a professor of mathematics at the Naval Postgraduate School.

== Education and career ==
Gera was an undergraduate at Western Michigan University, graduating Phi Beta Kappa and with honors in mathematics in 1999. She remained at Western Michigan University for her doctoral studies, completing a PhD in 2005 under the supervision of Ping Zhang; her dissertation was Stratification and Domination in Graphs and Digraphs.

She has been a faculty member at the Naval Postgraduate School since 2005, and became a full professor there in 2018. She served as Associate Provost For Graduate Education from 2018 to 2021, and at the same time served as the founding director of the Teaching and Learning Commons at the Naval Postgraduate School.

== Recognition ==
In 2016, the Naval Postgraduate School gave Gera their Richard W. Hamming Excellence in Teaching Award.
