= Karan Gera =

Indian artist

Karan Gera is an Indian artist. He is one of the youngest ever to win the Lalit Kala Akademi award. Recently he completed a solo exhibition at the Indian Council for Cultural Relations. His recent exhibition Grand India received positive reception from veteran artist Satish Gujral and South African painter Marlene Dumas.

== UnTerror ==
Unterror is a project by Karan Gera. UnTerror has been featured in several exhibits around the world including the Warriors of Peace exhibition at the Open Studio Gallery in Singapore in October 2009 Unterror has also been featured in the Art & Revolution exhibition organized by European Institute for Progressive Cultural Policies (EICP). On Mahatma Gandhi's birthday on 2 October 2009, the Gandhi Museum in Mumbai included UnTerror in its exhibition on Mahatma Gandhi.

== International exhibitions ==
- 2002 – Cinema India: Art of Bollywood at Victoria and Albert Museum
- 2002–2003 – Bollywood in Love: Bollywood Romantic Poster Group Exhibition across Bradford, Bristol, Birmingham, London, Paris, Berlin, and Prague
- 2006 – SOLO Exhibition "Shadow of God" at India's National Academy of Art- Lalit Kala Akademi
- 2008–2009 – Grand India
- 2009 – Warriors of Peace exhibition at Open Studio gallery, Singapore
