= Lalit Kala Akademi =

India's national academy of fine arts

Lalit Kala Academy
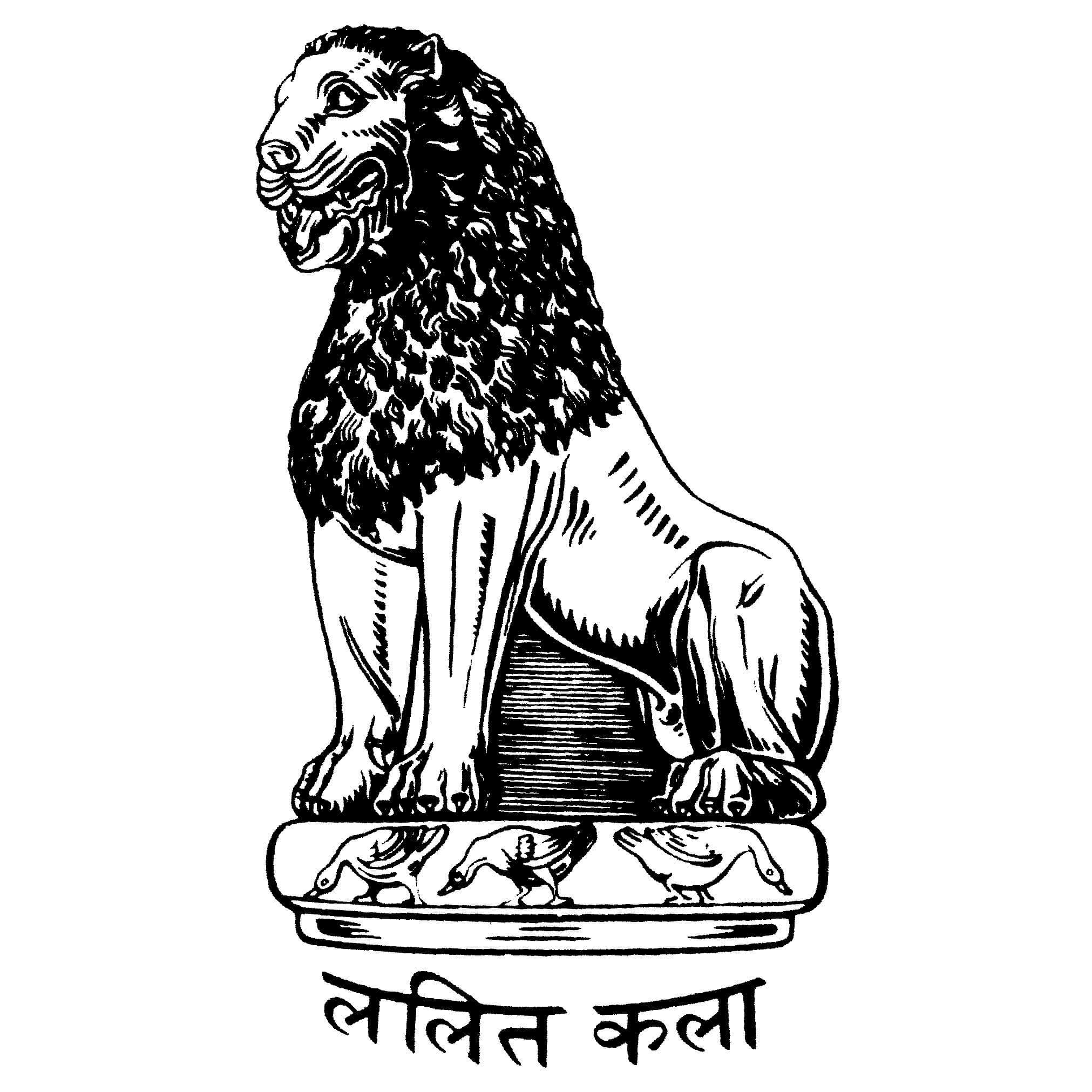
- Emblem of Lalit Kala Akademi

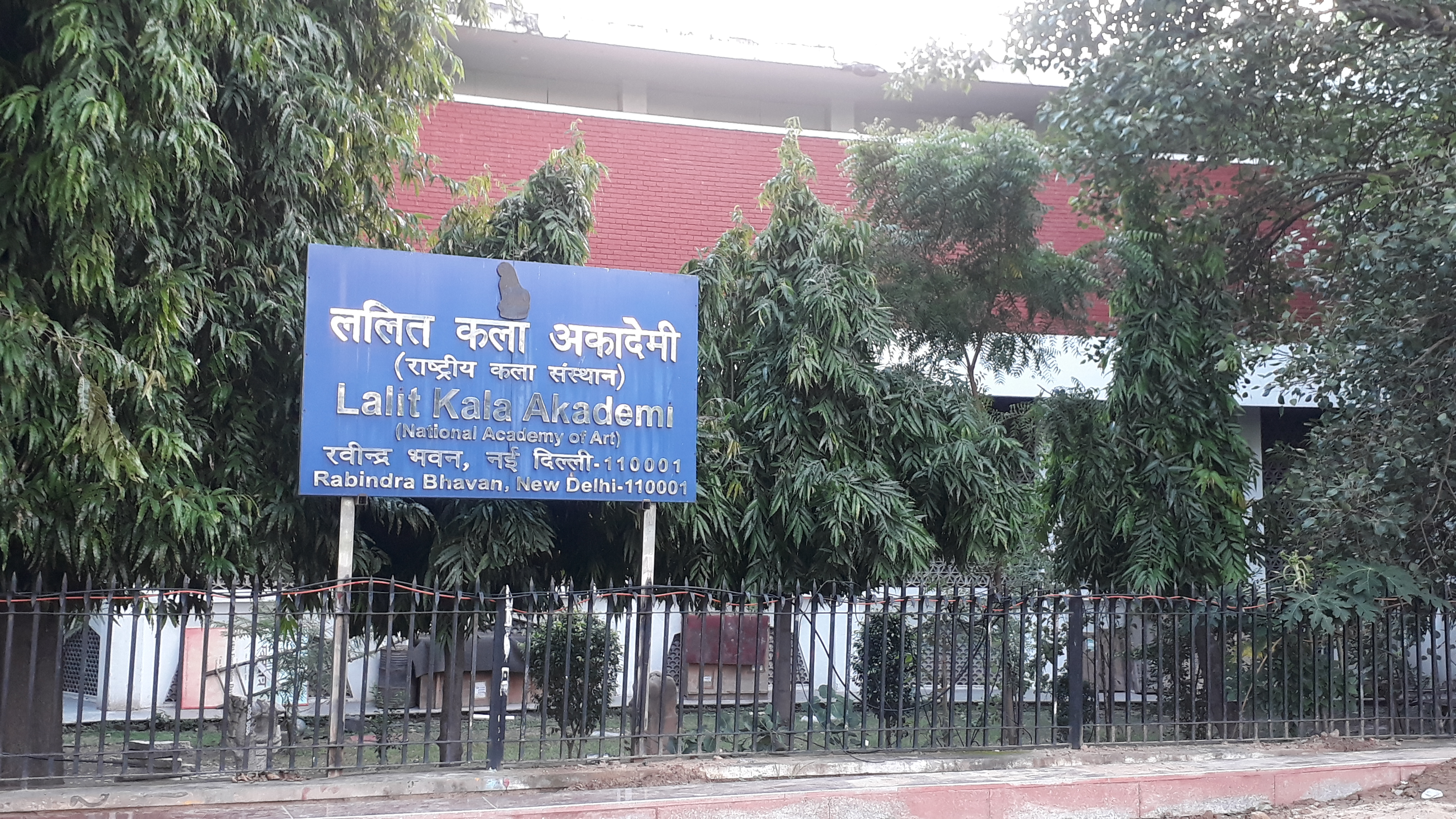
- Lalit Kala Gallery, Rabindra Bhawan
- Abbreviation: LKA
- Formation: 5 August 1954; 72 years ago
- Headquarters: Rabindra Bhavan, Delhi
- Location: New Delhi, India
- Region served: India
- Official language: English
- Parent organisation: Ministry of Culture, Government of India
- Website: lalitkala.gov.in

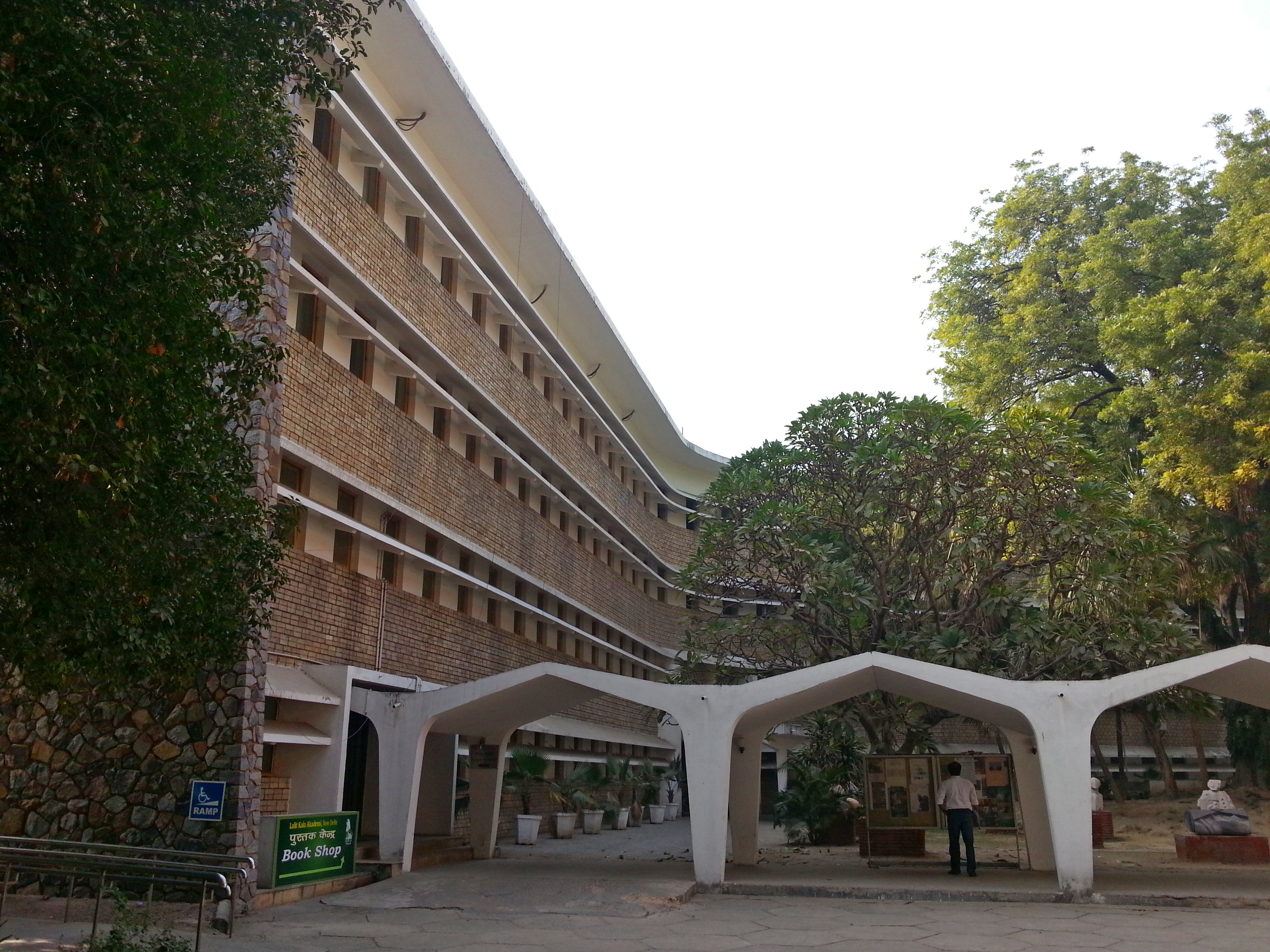
Rabindra Bhawan, Delhi which houses the Sangeet Natak Akademi, Lalit Kala Akademi and Sahitya Akademi.

The Lalit Kala Akademi or National Academy of Art (LKA) is India's national academy of fine arts. It is an autonomous organisation, established in New Delhi in 1954 by Government of India to promote and propagate understanding of Indian art, in and outside the country.

LKA provides scholarships and a fellow program, and sponsors and organises exhibitions in India and overseas. It publishes a bilingual journal. It is funded by the Union Ministry of Culture. Its headquarters are at Ravindra Bhawan, Ferozshah Road, New Delhi.

== History ==
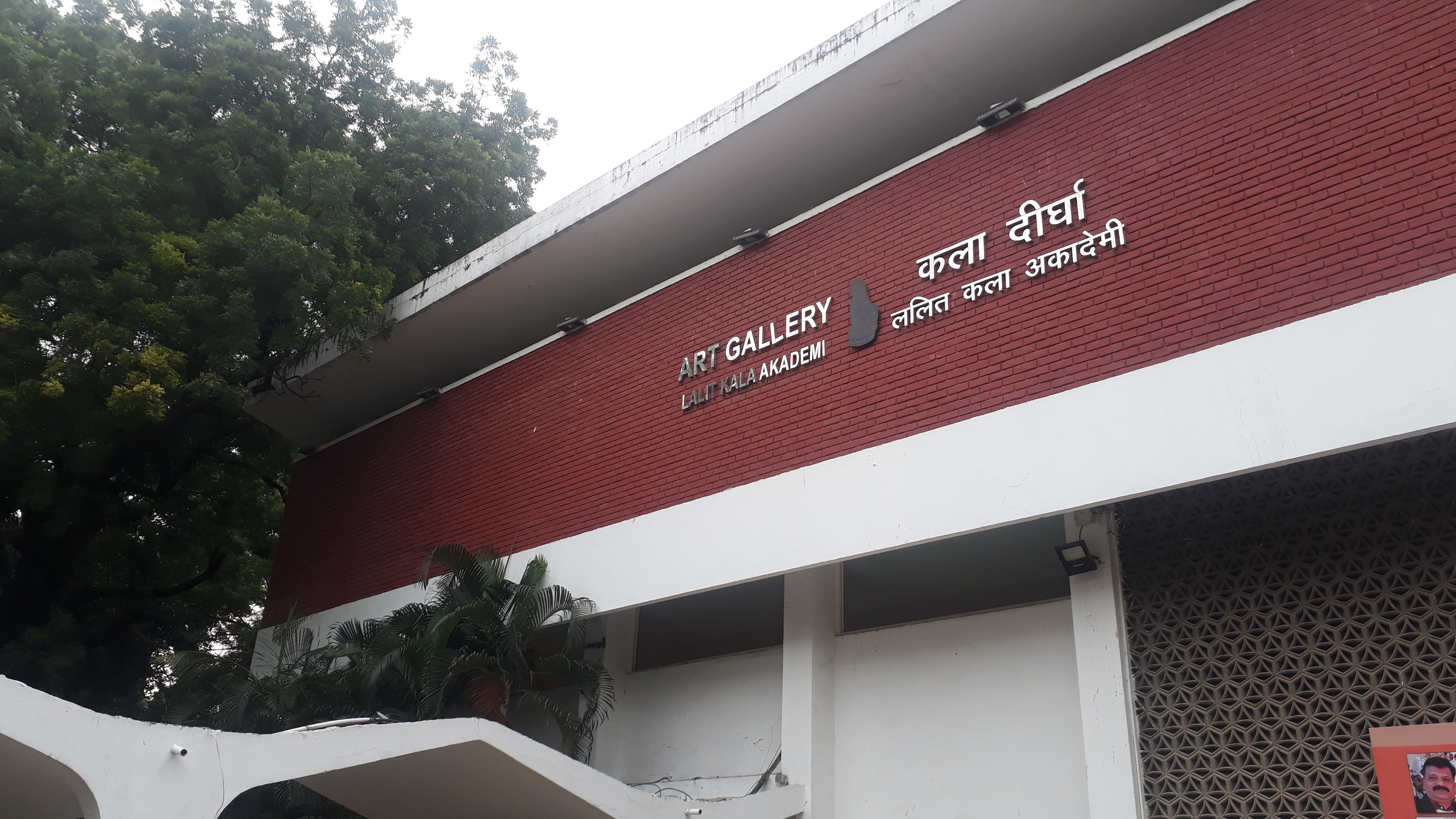
Art Gallery at Lalit Kala Akademi, Delhi.

After achieving independence in 1947, the leaders of India's nationalist movement realised the value of culture as a vehicle of interaction and its importance in shaping not only the Indian identity on its own, but also carving out a sphere of interaction where other art forms would further the cause of national unity. It was seen necessary that a cultural reorganisation of the nation should come through the institutional infrastructure of the state. The state patronage was not for the art, but for the artists, who using the physical environment and infrastructural facilities provided to them, could carry on with their art. Unlike private institutions which could change their program of support depending on market conditions, the Lalit Kala Akademi sought to support all forms of art — studio, experimental, developmental, 'folk', and 'tribal'.

In constructing a national heritage of India, — ancient, medieval, as well as modern lineages were to be taken into account. In the wake of the anti-colonial independence movement, the developments in Modern Art drew from the underlying currents that linked modernity with an inherited, indigenous past. The art-historian Partha Mitter, has argued that Modern Art in India developed through a series of interactions and frictions between "colonial hegemony and national self-image". Emerging out of the colonial encounter with the Western "other", the options available were within the confines of colonial ideologies as well as colonial institutions of art.

Anubha Mehta notes that the Gandhian movement was a political one, and not a social one. There were only a few phases when the artists were directly involved. Most important was the moment of Nandalal Bose's involvement. From 1920, some occasional exhibitions of paintings coincided with the sessions of the Indian National Congress. In 1936, Nandalal Bose responded to Gandhi's summons to organise an exhibition of Indian art at the Lucknow session of the INC. From hereon, the project of placing exhibitions of a continuous history of Indian art became important. In 1937, the entire Congress township at Faizpur in Maharashtra was designed as an ideological statement by prominent Modern artists. By 1938, the INC pavilions at Haripura were decorated by artists from Shantiniketan led by Nandalal Bose. Drawing stylistic inspiration from 'folk' art, the subject matter was rural life, and ordinary people. This was an important moment in India's history of Modern Art as it revelled in the affinity with folk, which seemed to underline an imaginative and technical range that had a richer visual vocabulary than that of Western Academism. This art is made to appeal both to the connoisseur and the common man. This came to be the nationalist alternative that was firmly in opposition to the colonial art establishment. The multiplicity of responses of the Indian artists to western modes of art served as a catalytic force and created a foundation for exploring what could be the specific Indian character of modern Indian art. This very cause, of the Indian character, was taken up by the Lalit Kala Akademi when it was established in 1954.

Artists like Nandalal Bose, Jamini Roy, and Abanindranath Tagore came to be seen as 'authentic' because their subject matter incorporated many folk idioms that they inculcated over time through their involvement in the Gandhian phase of the nationalist movement after 1920. These idioms were accommodated, aestheticised, and modernised into the canon of Indian Modernism. The selective focus of the official cultural discourse became a major factor in defining Modern Art in India. In 1950, the President commissioned Nandalal Bose to complete a set of paintings for the original handwritten manuscript of the Indian constitution. He was later bestowed with various national awards and his work was celebrated as that of a 'national artist'. The Lalit Kala Akademi sold his paintings as a special portfolio (1982–83) in all their centenary publications as a landmark in modern art.

In adherence to this idea of nationalism in modern Indian art, Maulana Azad, the Minister of Education set up the Lalit Kala Akademi so that the state could carry forward the cultural renaissance in India and patronise art with an impact and reach across the country.

By the 1940s, there was an emergence of organised groups of artists in Calcutta, Bombay, Delhi, and Madras. There were some prominent organisations in Delhi which worked towards the promotion of visual arts in the country. Important among them were the Sarada Ukil School of art, the All India Fine Arts and Crafts Society and the Delhi Shilpi Chakra. The Minister of Education had also set up an art department in the Delhi Polytechnic in 1942.

In April 2015, the Government of India took over management control of Lalit Kala Akademi citing complaints regarding alleged administrative and financial irregularities in its functioning.

== Formation ==
As the national academy of fine arts, the Lalit Kala Akademi was envisioned with a clear perspective regarding its purpose as a National institutions. It was established on 5 August 1954. Nehru envisioned the LKA as being democratic in its reach, membership and functioning, whereas Azad's idea of it was based on the line of the French Academy which had a rather exclusivist criteria. Contradictions like these abound. While one of the constitutional objects of the LKA in 1954 was to preserve and project art forms of surviving indigenous craftsmen, painters, and sculptors, the "Creative Arts" as defined in the 1954 constitution are only paintings, sculpture, and graphics. In 1978, the rules of participation of the Triennial stated that the art forms constantly referred to as 'folk', 'tribal', and 'tradition' would not be allowed as they are not in the ambit of the "contemporary". Even as the organisation wanted to organise itself at an All India level, there is not a single official document professing linkages between the State Lalit Kala Akademis, Regional Centres, and the Zonal Cultural Centres. The orientations of the officials at the helm of the organisation and their professional credentials have constantly affected the nature of design, legislation, and implementation of LKA's programmes. The initial thrust of LKA's responsibilities emerged from conceptual framework of the founding father. Azad defined the role of LKA as "providing facilities for training the sensibilities by the practise of one of the fine arts". The purpose was to develop finer aspects of the citizen's personality.

The conflict in the constitutional objectives led to much confusion about its policy perspective especially in determining its nature as either an exclusive, elite organisation or as a one that was democratic in approach and functioning. In an absence of a clearly stated programme, LKA ended up being both. Both Nehru and Azad agreed in granting the members of the LKA total autonomy regarding internal functioning and programme legislation. Majority of the programmer were designed and carried forwards within the elite circuits of art forms and artists. This elite orientation also affected the forms of visual arts incorporated. For instance, in the 1940s and 50s, the contemporary art scene saw a predominance of painters. Consequently, the artists accommodated in the official rolls of the newly founded LKA ended up being mostly painters. Therefore, LKA was established largely as an Akademi of painters.

The constitutional objectives along with the institutional functioning of the LKA have been reviewed on three occasions by committees appointed by the government of India.

- Bhabha committee in 1962
- Khosla committee National Exhibition of Art in 1972
- Haksar committee in 1992

== Activities ==
=== National Exhibition of Art ===
In the formative years, a lot of emphasis was laid on the Exhibitions to establish the institutional personality of the LKA. The first seven years saw a lot of fanfare in terms of activities and were always inaugurated by the president and vice-president of India. As early as 1955–56, LKA sent its first exhibition abroad with a two-member delegation for the period of one year to six countries. Through its international exhibitions programme, it sought National Exhibition of Art to justify itself not only to India but to the world.

The National Exhibition of Art (NEA) is the most prestigious annual event organised by the LKA. Every year it exhibits and awards artists. From 1958 until the 1980s, the LKA followed a practice of purchasing works during the NEAs annually to add to their permanent collection. The objective was to create a museum of acclaimed artworks with the LKA that was purchased through its own exhibitions. From the 1980s, the LKA developed a practice of carrying exhibitions of artworks from their permanent collection under a particular theme. In 1997, the government took over the management of the LKA for some years and the programme of purchasing artworks was abandoned, among the reasons cited was the kind of control commanded by private art galleries over the art market.

=== Rashtriya Kala Melas ===
The Rashtriya Kala Mela, as art fairs became a regular complementary feature of the Triennale. They were seen as events that widened the scope of the Triennale and formed the basis of a national cultural festival that could embrace the arts.

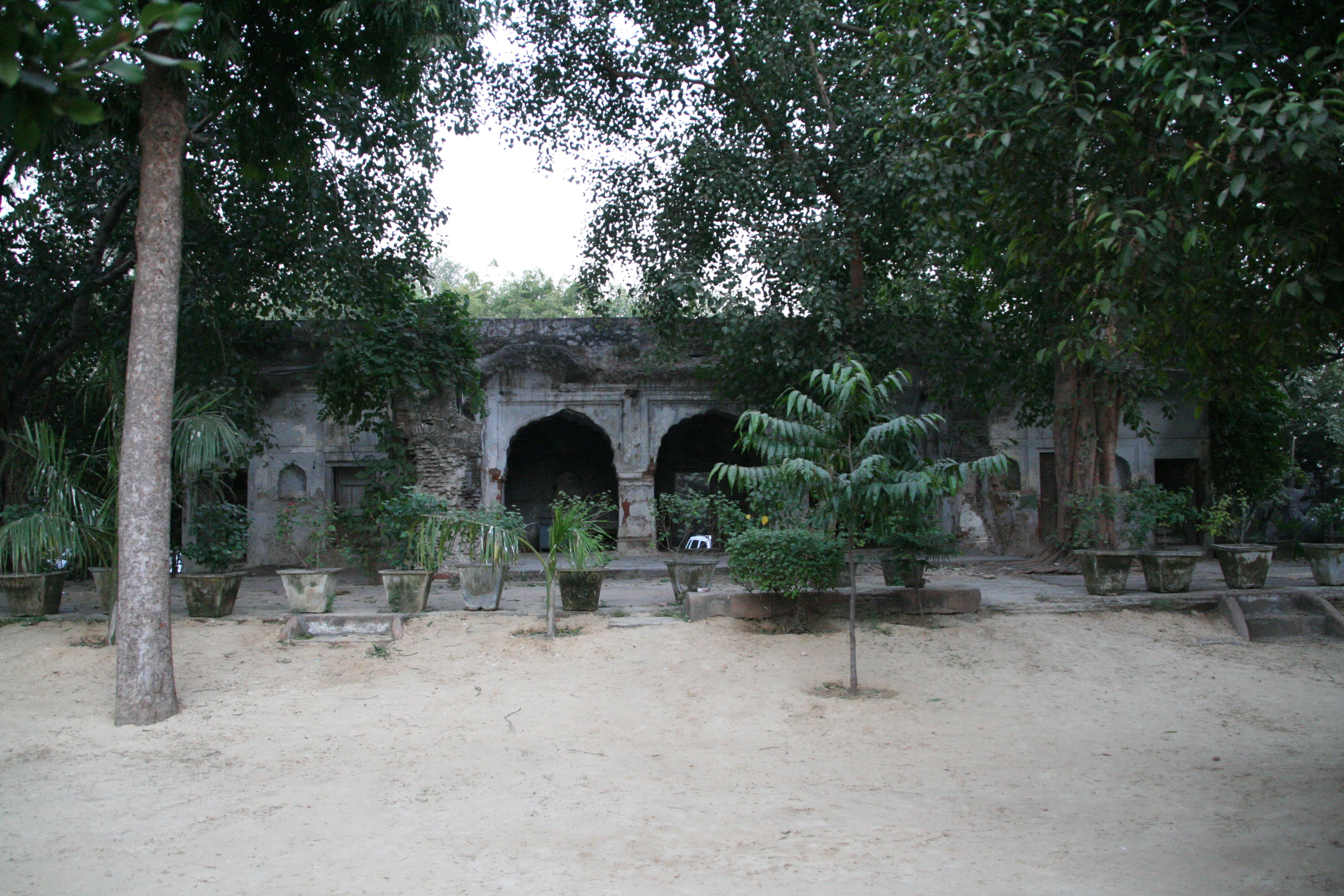
Garhi Art studios

=== Garhi Studios ===
The LKA provided for the Garhi Studios as an institutional facility for the organisation of seminars, artist workshops, lecture demonstrations, and exhibitions. Beginning with the establishment of eight studios at Bistidari Malcha Mahal in New Delhi, it was expanded to thirty-six studios — including thirty two individual studios and four community studios. It has become a center for arranging exhibitions, ceremonial events, artists' camps, seminars etc. The functions it performs are much beyond the scope of a studio. For instance, in the 1978 Triennale, the Garhi center was a major activity hub. Souvenirs were made by these studios for foreign dignitaries and its grounds were used to host meetings, camps, on-the-spot workshops, and displays.

== The Triennale-India ==
In 1968, the LKA started its ambitious programme aiming to enter the international art circuit with the Triennale-India exhibitions. In these exhibitions, a host of countries were invited to participate in New Delhi at regular intervals of 3–4 years. It began at a point in time when the purposed of such international exhibitions in the west was already being questioned. There were however many who believed in the potential of the Triennale as a pre-requisite for an internationalism of the arts. With the end of colonialism, new dimensions, context and idioms were developing - and the Triennale aimed not only at creating a meeting ground for artists from the global south but also for those of the industrially developed countries.

Nancy Adajania writes how the Triennale echos the rhetoric surrounding internationalism as not necessarily a monopoly of the industrially advanced societies of West Europe and North America. It was an assertion that the societies of the global South could stake an equal claim in articulating a vision of the world. The Triennale had its roots in the Non-Alignment Movement's notion of the third-way or third position in global politics. Mulk Raj Anand, who proposed and founded the Triennale saw treated non-alignment as a "genealogical matrix". Centered around Anand's creative humanist approach, the first edition of Triennale India brought together 609 works from 31 countries.

In the 1970s, Vivan Sundaram's protest against the Triennale was emanating from the emphasis on the international that overlooked and marginalised Indian's own complex history. Among the many reasons behind the protest was also to call for a democratisation of the working of the LKA. The acclaimed art-crtitc Geeta Kapur emerged as one of the most vehement critics of the Triennale as she recognised their narrow economism as an extension of the international art exhibitions with vested commercial interests of commercial art dealers operating at the behest of both public and private, individual and national agents.

Because of this international outlook, the Triennale became a priority overshadowing other roles and responsibilities. It became more important than the constitutional objectives of development, encouragement, and promotion of existing forms of contemporary Indian Art. The representations at the Triennale were to be a reputed and acclaimed stature, and this led to a shift in focus from the art form to the artist. It was in the mid-60s through the Triennale that the LKA made a statement on the state of arts in India. According to LKA, the contemporary Indian art had taken a definitive turn towards the individual experiences and ideas. In March 1977, the Triennale Committee declared that a strong Indian section could only be presented if the Triennale was not treated as a ground for exploring new talent, something that the NEA could take care of.

== Centers ==
The centers of Lalit Kala Academy include:

- Bhubaneswar
- Chennai
- Bangalore
- Garhi Delhi
- Kolkata
- Lucknow
- Shimla

== Chairman ==
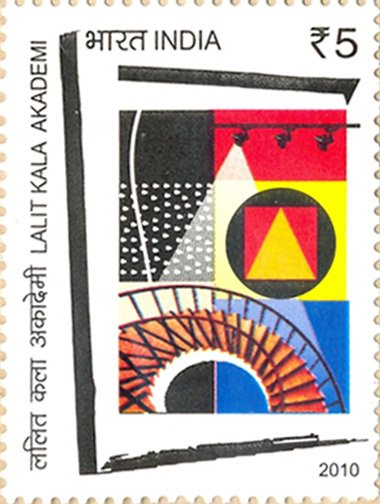
Stamp of India 2010 Lalit Kala Akademi

- On 17 May 2018 President Ram Nath Kovind appointed Uttam Pacharne, an artist and sculptor as chairman of the Lalit Kala Akademi. He is a member of the advisory committee, Kala Academy, Goa and member of advisory committee, P L Deshpande State Lalit Kala Academy and director, Janseva Sahakari Bank, Borivali, Mumbai. He would hold office for a term of three years from the date on which he assumes charge. He is the recipient of National Lalit Kala Award 1985, Maharashtra Gaurav Puraskar 1985 from Government of Maharashtra, Junior National Award 1986 and Jeevan Gaurav Puraskar 2017 from Prafulla Dahanukar Foundation.
- In March, President Ram Nath Kovind appointed M.L. Srivastava, joint secretary (Academies) at the Ministry of Culture, as the pro-tem chairman of the Lalit Kala Akademi.
- Since the Government took over, former Chairman of Karnataka Lalit Kala Academy CS Krishna Setty, a well-known artist and art critic headed LKA as Administrator. After being charged with misappropriation of funds in mid-2017, the ministry instituted a three-member inquiry committee to probe the allegations. This order was withdrawn on 16 August 2017. The Delhi high court, which heard the PIL alleging misappropriation of funds at the national arts body, had sought an explanation from the ministry on 24 August 2017, however, the ministry did not reply. As the next date of hearing of the case was 8 May, the ministry decided to let Setty go in the first week of April 2018, after the Prime Minister's Office (PMO), in 2017, took note of repeated complaints, including missing artworks of the celebrated painter M.F. Husain from the Akademi. In reply to a newspaper, he stated, "M.F. Husain's work disappeared (from the Lalit Kala Akademi) long ago. It didn't happen in my tenure and so I am not connected to it".
- The former pro tem chairman of LKA was artist Balan Nambiar.
- Ashok Vajpeyi (April 2008-December 2011)
- Current chairman V. Nagdas was appointed on13 March 2023.He is a recipient of several prestigious awards like the National Academy Award from Lalit Kala Akademi, International Print Biennial Award from Bharat Bhavan Bhopal, Grand Award of AIFACS, and Gold medal of Kerala Lalit Kala Akademi.

== Events ==
On 16 September 2014, Lalit Kala Akademi's 60th anniversary was marked by an event, "Spirit of Delhi", during which poets and artists showcased their exclusive artwork.

== National Art Award ==
The National Art Award is one of the awards and honours in India and Asia awarded by Lalit Kala Akademi. In these awards, a plaque, a shawl and 2 lakh rupees are given to the awardee. Karan Gera is one of the youngest ever to win the Lalit Kala Akademi award.

== See also ==
- List of Lalit Kala Akademi fellows
- Sahitya Kala Parishad
