= Neeraj Kumar (filmmaker) =

American actor

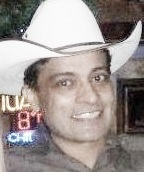
- Born: India
- Occupations: Filmmaker, actor, director, software engineer
- Website: Official site

Neeraj Kumar is an american filmmaker, actor, writer and director at Neerajfilms and software consultant based in the United States. His debut film, the critically acclaimed children's human rights feature-length documentary film, Child Marriage, won the 2005 New York International Independent Film & Video Festival Best International Documentary Award, and recognition in the South Asian International Film Festival. He is dedicated to making socially conscious documentaries and fiction films.

He is also an actor. He played the leading roles in the satire films titled What the Hell! and The Great Meltdown.

== Filmography ==
- Child Marriage (2005)
- What the Hell (2006)
- The Great Meltdown (2007)

== Awards and recognition ==
- 2005 New York International Independent Film & Video Festival - Best Documentary International
- South Asian International Film Festival - Best Documentary
