= Niraj Gera =

Indian photographer and social activist

- Occupations: Photographer, motivational speaker, social activist
- Organization: Humanify Foundation
- Website: www.nirajgera.com

Niraj Gera is an Indian photographer based in New Delhi., social activist and a faculty member at the Art of Living Foundation.

== Work ==
=== As a Photographer ===
Niraj Gera is a social documentary photographer & he has made various social photo-documentary series such as Sacred Transformations, Sacred Stains, Sacred Love & Immortal Love on various social issues including acid attacks, stigmatization of menstruation etc.

=== As a Social Activist ===
Gera is also the founder of Humanify Foundation, which works to create awareness among girls, women, and men on menstrual health and hygiene and educates and sensitises them through menstrual awareness camps. He is also a TEDx speaker & also conducts motivational sessions for students
