= Neeraj Kumar Singh =

Indian Army Ashoka Chakra recipient (died 2014)

Naik Neeraj Kumar Singh AC
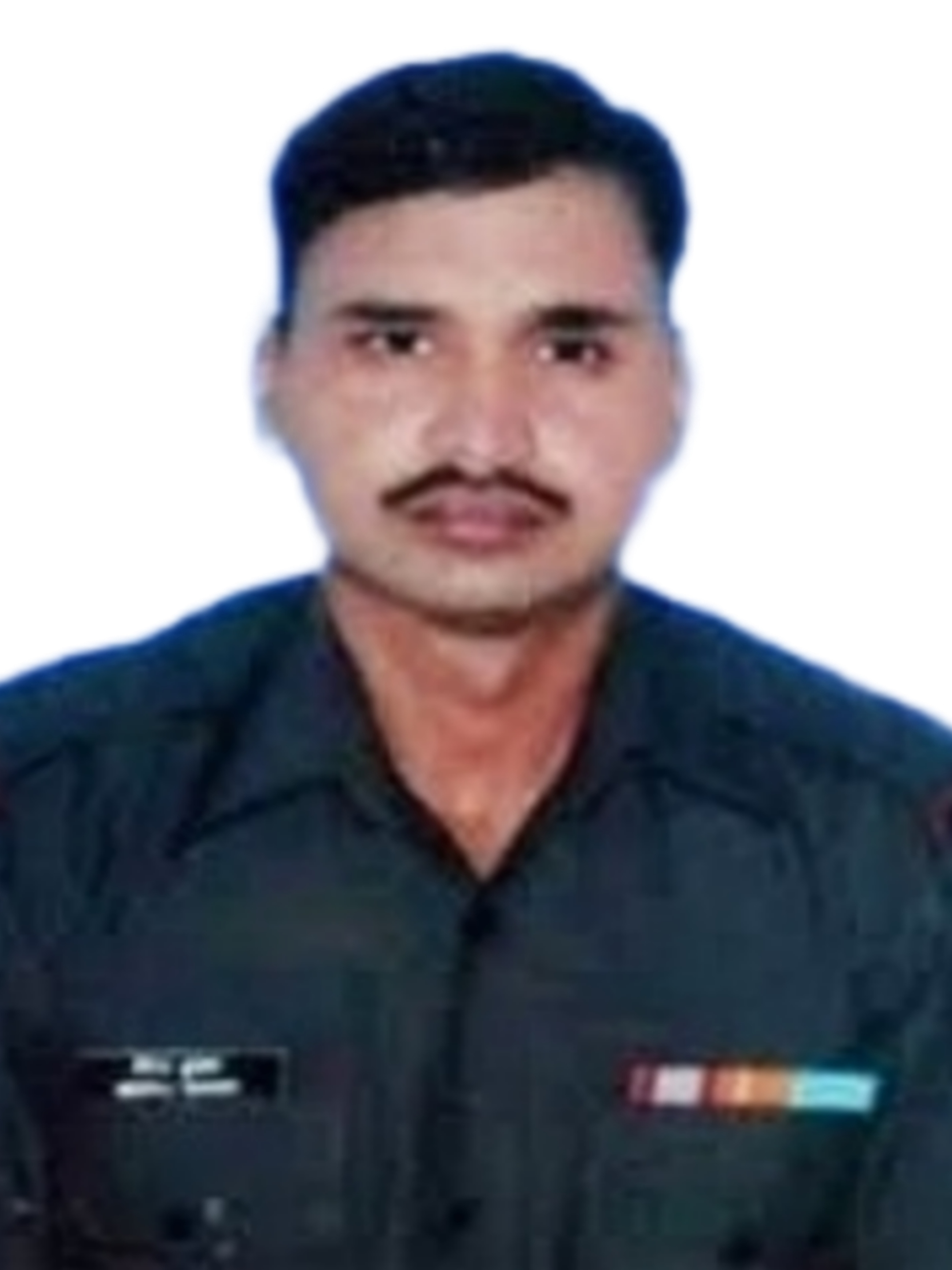
- Portrait of Nk Neeraj Kumar Singh
- Born: Bulandshahr district, Uttar Pradesh, India
- Died: 24 August 2014; Kupwara district, Jammu and Kashmir, India
- Military career
- Allegiance: India
- Branch: Indian Army
- Service years: ? – 2014
- Rank: Naik
- Service number: 16012114A
- Units: 13th Rajputana Rifles battalion 57 Rashtriya Rifles battalion
- Conflicts: Insurgency in Jammu and Kashmir †
- Awards: Ashok Chakra

Naik Neeraj Kumar Singh, AC was a Non Commissioned Officer (NCO) in the Indian Army who was posthumously awarded the Ashok Chakra, the country’s highest peacetime military decoration on 26 January 2015. He had enlisted in the 13th battalion, Rajputana Rifles and was serving in the 57th battalion Rashtriya Rifles when he was killed in action.

While leading a search operation at Kupwara in Jammu & Kashmir on 24 August 2014, Singh came under heavy fire from terrorists. He rescued an injured soldier and shot one of the terrorists dead.

== Early life ==
Naik Neeraj Kumar Singh hailed from Devrala village in Bulandshahar district of Uttar Pradesh. He was the son of Shri Omvir Singh and Shrimati Rajas. His father was a farmer. He had three more siblings.

== Military career ==
Neeraj Kumar Singh had enlisted in the 13 Battalion of Rajputana Rifles in Indian Army . He was deputed to serve in the 57 Battalion of the Rashtriya Rifles for anti-terrorist operations after serving for in his regiment. For his bravery, courage and self sacrifice he was posthumously awarded Ashoka Chakra, India's highest peacetime gallantry award.

== Ashoka Chakra awardee ==
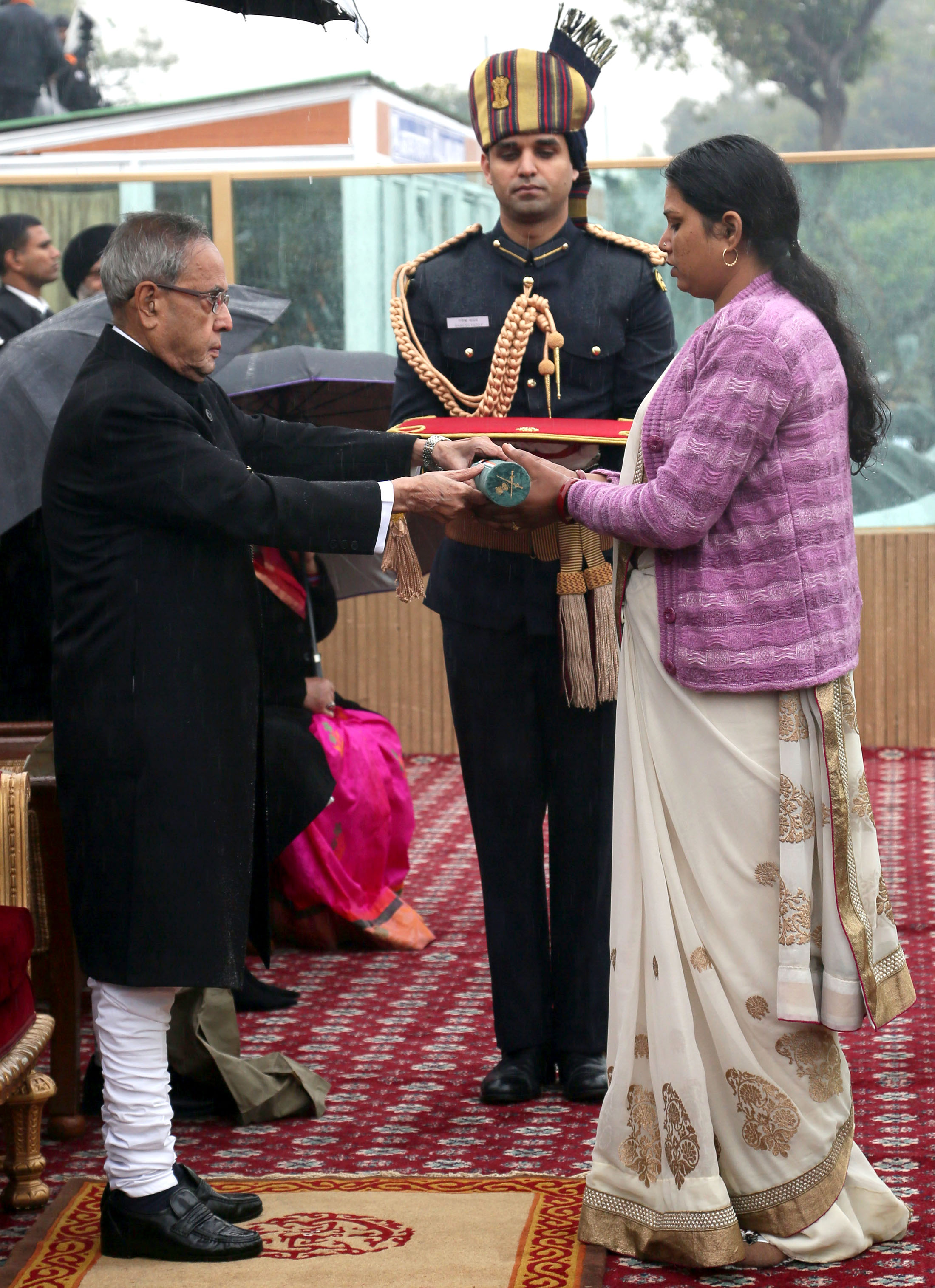
Neeraj Kumar Singh's wife receives the Ashok Chakra from president Pranab Mukherjee on 26 January 2015.

He was awarded India's Highest Peacetime Gallantry Award- Ashoka Chakra on 26 January 2015, Republic Day. His award citation reads:

Based on specific intelligence, Brigade Ghataks launched a Search and Destroy Operation at General area Gurdaji of Kupwara district of Jammu and Kashmir on 24 August 2014. At 1025 hours, party noticed movement of few terrorists close to a Dhok, who opened indiscriminate fire on own troops. In the ensuring fire fight, a friend of Naik Neeraj was hit on bullet proof jacket. With utter disregard for his personal safety, Naik Neeraj crawled and extricated his friend. A terrorist threw grenades and brought heavy fire on Naik Neeraj. In a daring act, he inched closer to the terrorist and shot him dead. Simultaneously, the NCO was attacked by another terrorist resulting in dropping of his Rifle and the terrorist shot him in the chest. Despite grievous injuries, displaying unparalleled courage, he pounced on the terrorist, snatched his weapon and killed him in hand-to-hand combat. He refused to be evacuated till he became unconscious and was evacuated by helicopter to 92 Base Hospital, where he succumbed to his injuries.

== Personal life ==
He loved his military life. He even wished that his two sons Kunal and Lovepita could also become army officers. Naik Neeraj Kumar is survived by his parents, wife Parameshwari and two sons, Kunal and Lovepita.
